

Sabra

Sabreclaw
Sabreclaw is a character in the MC2 universe who first appeared in J2 #8 (May 1999). He is the half-brother of Wild Thing and the son of Wolverine.

The character has claws (similar to Sabretooth), a healing factor, enhanced physical capabilities and a temper (similar to Wolverine).  His healing factor allows him to rapidly regenerate damaged or destroyed areas of his cellular structure and affords him virtual immunity to poisons and most drugs, as well as enhanced resistance to diseases. He has superhuman strength, naturally sharp fangs and claws reinforced with adamantium sheaths.

Sabretooth

Gwenny Lou Sabuki
Gwendolyne "Gwenny" Lou Sabuki was the second Golden Girl introduced by Marvel. She made her first appearance in 1978, but her World War II-era character predates the post-war Golden Girl, Betsy Ross. Created by writer Roy Thomas and penciller Frank Robbins in the Retcon series The Invaders #26 (March 1978), she had appeared, sans power, as Gwenny Lou. She gained her powers in the following issue, #27 (April 1978), and went on to appear as the Golden Girl in #28 (May 1978) and #38 (March 1979). A flashback story featuring her as one of the Kid Commandos is in All-New Invaders #6–7.

During World War II, teenaged Gwenny Lou Sabuki, daughter of Japanese-American scientist Dr. Sam Sabuki, was present at a stateside battle in which sidekicks Bucky and Toro of the Invaders superhero team fought the supervillain Agent Axis. One of Dr. Sabuki's inventions accidentally gave Gwenny Lou and her friend David "Davey" Mitchell superhuman powers. Gwenny Lou gained the power to generate light and energy and the ability to project golden force beams from her hands. Mitchell gained the ability to spin at superhuman speeds. She became Golden Girl, and he became the Human Top. The four youthful heroes defeated Agent Axis and later formed the Kid Commandos, who were allied with the adult Invaders.

In one incident, the Kid Commandos also fought the Invaders because they disagreed with the military's use of a Tsunami Bomb, which would have caused too much collateral damage. The bomb was never used because the Invaders saw the testing site was populated with civilians.

Gwenny Lou later helped found the post-war organization known as the V-Battalion. Gwenny eventually changed her superhero name to Golden Woman before she died in 1961. Her son and her granddaughter became the superheroes Golden Sun and Goldfire, respectively, although Golden Sun died when his own daughter was five years old. Another of Gwenny Lou's granddaughters eventually became the Japanese heroine Radiance.

Sage

Sagittarius

Harlan Vargas

Life Model Decoy

Life Model Decoy II

Ecliptic

Unnamed

Lynn Sakura
Lynn Sakura is a minor character within Marvel Comics. The character, created by writer Fiona Avery and artist Mark Brooks, first appeared in Amazing Fantasy #1 (August 2004). She is Anya Corazon's childhood friend. Lynn and Anya are classmates at Milton Summers High School in Fort Greene, Brooklyn. Lynn often supports Anya who juggles a double life as Araña with the Spider Society. Jon Kasiya (the Sisterhood of the Wasp's assassin prodigy Amun) threatened Anya's loved ones, Lynn and Gil Corazon, after enrolling at their school. Lynn tried to start a relationship with Kasiya, not knowing about the threat. Anya tried to interfere with the budding relationship and saved Lynn and Kasiya from a gunman.

Lynn Sakura in other media 
A variation of the character renamed Maria Corazon appears in the Spider-Man episode "Generations", voiced by Valenzia Algarin. An amalgamation of Maria Vasquez and other minor characters, this version is Anya Corazon's scientifically minded stepsister. She is studying in South America for her Ph.D.

Sandman

Sangre

Saracen

Sasquatch

Sat-Yr-9

Satana

Satannish

Saturnyne

Saul

Sauron

Savage Steel
Disillusioned by the justice system and what they viewed as its lenient stance on crime, a number of New York City Police Department officers came together to form an organization that would kill criminals, rather than simply jailing them. Calling themselves the "Cabal," the group commissioned Stane International to give them an edge in their crusade. Stane's company designed and manufactured a suit of powered armor, the "Savage Steel" battle-suit, based on technology stolen from Stark Enterprises. Different members of the Cabal all took turns wearing the suit, including Paul Trent and former members Harry Lennox, Johnny Leone, and Jimmy Zafar. Savage Steel was first seen battling Darkhawk, and killed some drug dealers. Savage Steel then tried to kill the Punisher, battled the Punisher, Darkhawk, and weapons dealers. Savage Steel attacked Phillippe Bazin during his trial, and was revealed as Harry Lennox. The Cabal's creation of the Savage Steel identity is discovered. Darkhawk defeats the Cabal and most, but not all, of its members are taken into custody.

Police van driver Arthur Vale then steals The Savage Steel armor and adopts the Savage Steel identity. Vale attempted to gain new weaponry but was defeated by Iron Man, who regains and deactivates his stolen technology.

Jimmy Zafar rescued the imprisoned Cabal members Vale and Lennox, and faked their deaths and his own. Vale, Lennox, Leone and Zafar join the Witness Relocation Program. Zafar later stole the rebuilt armor from renegade Stane technicians, and adopted the Savage Steel identity. With Darkhawk as an ally, the new Savage Steel battled terrorists. He later attempted to aid Darkhawk against an invasion of Mahari space pirates led by Overhawk, but was knocked out of the fight. He met up with Darkhawk and his other allies after the battle.

Happy Sam Sawyer

Rafael Scarfe

Lt. Rafael 'Rafe' Scarfe is a fictional New York City Police Lieutenant in Marvel Comics. The character, created by Chris Claremont and Pat Broderick, first appeared in Marvel Premiere #23 (August 1975).

Rafe was a former Vietnam War veteran who returned to New York to become a police officer. He grew close to his partner Misty Knight and when she lost her arm in a bomb explosion, Scarfe never left her side. He was a recurring ally of Iron Fist, and later Luke Cage when the two came together to form Heroes for Hire and teamed up with Misty and Colleen Wing, often helping them with cases and arresting the bad guys they fought. He even teamed up with Spider-Man ally Jean DeWolff. Years later, in the Shadowland storyline, Scarfe later went rogue and tried to frame Daredevil for the murder of several criminals. He is later captured by his former partner, Misty Knight.

Rafael Scarfe in other media
Rafael Scarfe appears in Luke Cage, portrayed by Frank Whaley. This version is a corrupt NYPD Detective at the 29th Precinct partnered with Misty Knight who secretly works for Cornell "Cottonmouth" Stokes. After internal affairs begin investigating him, Scarfe attempts to blackmail Stokes, who shoots him and leaves him for dead. Before he dies, the former tells Luke Cage and Claire Temple everything he knows about Stokes' criminal activities.

Scaleface

Scalphunter

Scanner

Scarecrow

Scarlet Scarab

Scarlet Spider

Ben Reilly

Joe Wade

Michael Van Patrick clones

Kaine

Scarlet Witch

Schizoid Man
The Schizoid Man is an alias used by two fictional supervillains who appear in American comic books published by Marvel Comics.

Chip Martin
Chip Martin first appeared in Spectacular Spider-Man (vol. 2) #36 (November 1979), and was created by Bill Mantlo, John Romita, Jr. and Jim Mooney. A graduate student at Empire State University, he suffers from psychological instability and has the power of building and animating solid constructs with his mind. His father is Senator Robert Martin, a possible suspect as the Hobgoblin.

Schizoid Man joined Vil-Anon, a twelve-step program dedicated to helping individuals overcome criminal tendencies which also consisted of Armadillo, Equinox, Hypno-Hustler, Jackson Weele and Man-Bull.

In Civil War: Battle Damage Report, it is revealed that Chip and Lectronn engaged in a three-hour fight over New York that ended in a stalemate.

Schizoid Man was among several super-powered criminals housed in an unnamed, ill-equipped prison in the Avengers Vs. X-Men storylines aftermath. Rogue and Mimic had to fight the two off during a prison riot where Schizoid Man was trying to get control of himself.

The Schizoid Man possesses the power of building and animating solid constructs with his mind.

Ultimate Marvel version
The Ultimate Marvel equivalent of Schizoid Man is an unnamed genetically modified French citizen thanks to Jamie Madrox's stolen stem cells. He uses his similar self-replication powers to control a riot before joining the Liberators. His team leads a large army to invade and conquer the United States, leading to the deaths of the S.H.I.E.L.D. Giant-Man Reserves. Captain America and the Wasp defeat all of Schizoid Man's bodies that were "scattered all over the Triskelion".

Eric Schwinner
Eric Schwinner is a human scientist at GARID (Galannan Alternative Research for Immunization Development). He first appeared in Amazing Fantasy Issue #15 in August 1962. Schwinner ran the public demonstration that led to Peter Parker being bit by a radioactive spider. He works with Peter in the lab to understand the radioactive spiders, as well as to defeat Tendril, an escaped patient with mutated powers.

Scientist Supreme

Lyle Getz

George Clinton

Valdemar Tykkio

Hank Pym

Monica Rappaccini

Andrew Forson

Scimitar

Scintilla 

Scintilla (originally named Midget) is a member of the Shi'ar Imperial Guard. Created by Chris Claremont and Dave Cockrum, the character first appeared in X-Men #107 (October 1977). Scintilla has the ability to shrink to five percent of her normal size, and any size in between. Like many original members of the Imperial Guard, Scintilla is the analog of a character from DC Comics' Legion of Super-Heroes: in her case, Shrinking Violet.

Midget was amongst the first of the Imperial Guard encountered by the team of superhuman mutants known as the X-Men who sought to rescue the Princess Lilandra from her insane brother emperor D'Ken. Following the orders of their emperor, the Guard clashed with the X-Men on a nameless Shi'ar Empire planet, and were on the verge of winning when the band of interstellar freebooters known as the Starjammers arrived to turn the tide of battle in the X-Men's favor.

Sometime later, when Deathbird was empress, Midget joined the other Imperial Guard members in the battle against Excalibur and the Starjammers. Later, on Deathbird's behalf, Midget assisted the other Imperial Guardsmen in the battle against the X-Men and Starjammers, but was defeated by them.

Midget is renamed Scintilla at the outset of Operation: Galactic Storm, an intergalactic war between the Shi'ar and the Kree. The Imperial Guard are integral to the Sh'iar creating a massive super weapon — the "Nega-Bomb" — using Kree artifacts, including the original Captain Marvel's Nega-Bands, which the Guard steals from the dead hero's tomb. This bomb is capable of devastating an area equivalent to that of the Kree Empire (which is supposedly located throughout the Large Magellanic Cloud). Ultimately, the Nega Bomb device is successfully detonated, devastating the Kree Empire, with 98% of the Kree population dying instantaneously. The Shi'ar annex the remnants of the Kree Empire, with Deathbird becoming viceroy of the Kree territories.

Vulcan, a powerful mutant intent on conquering the Shi'ar Empire, fights the Guard beginning in The Uncanny X-Men #480 (2007). Tragically, Vulcan kills Cosmo and Smasher (and seemingly Impulse, Neutron, and Titan) before he is defeated by Gladiator, who puts out his left eye. Despite Scintilla's desire for revenge, Gladiator takes Vulcan into custody and imprisons him.

Scintilla has many further adventures with the Imperial Guard, in such storylines as "Emperor Vulcan," "Secret Invasion," X-Men: Kingbreaker, "War of Kings," and the "Trial of Jean Grey."

Scorcher

Scorpia
Scorpia is a fictional character appearing in American comic books published by Marvel Comics.

Elaine Coll is recruited by Silvermane from a mental hospital to become the new Scorpion. She opts to call herself Scorpia instead and is given robotic armor which enhanced her strength and speed by 500 percent. Scorpia successfully brings Deathlok to Silvermane and is ordered to ambush Spider-Man and Daredevil, who had infiltrated their base. She wears them down but is then betrayed by Silvermane, who shoots her in the back. Scorpia follows Spider-Man and Daredevil to Silvermane's location and immediately attacks him. Mainframe, another of Silvermane's mercenaries, takes control of Scorpia's cybernetic enhancements and uses her to attack Spider-Man. However, she soon regained mobility and blasted Silvermane. An explosion created by The Punisher knocked Scorpia off the building they were on, but a mentally conflicted Deathlok saved her. She then decided to flee the area rather than be put in prison.

Scorpia then joins the new Sinister Six (though there were seven members total). The team's main purpose was to stop Kaine from killing any more of Spider-Man's enemies. When Kaine disguised himself as Spider-Man and attacked Hobgoblin, Scorpia immediately joined the others in the battle. However, they were not accustomed to working together, much to Scorpia's disdain. Spider-Man eventually entered the battle and was able to defeat Scorpia. She also participated in another battle against Spider-Man with some of her former allies and new ones such as Boomerang and Jack O' Lantern. She was defeated when Spider-Man threw Jack O'Lantern at her.

Much later, Scorpia fights Spider-Man and Black Cat, and is defeated when Black Cat rips off her tail. She later reveals that she was hired by Alberto Ortega, the head of a local drug syndicate.

During the "Infinity" storyline, Scorpia appears as one of the female villains in the employ of Caroline Le Fay. She helps fight off Thanos' forces and later battles the Fearless Defenders. Scorpia remained in Le Fay's employ afterward, acting as one of her bodyguards during a meeting with the Mercs for Money.

During the "Hunted" storyline, Scorpia is among the animal-themed characters that were captured by Taskmaster and Black Ant for Kraven the Hunter's Great Hunt, which is sponsored by Arcade's company Arcade Industries. She was seen at a gathering held by Vulture. She was later freed when Kraven the Hunter told Arcade to lower the force field around Central Park.

Scorpia appears as a member of a female incarnation of the Sinister Syndicate. She states to Francine Frye that she heard about her frying the original Electro and stealing his schtick. The Sinister Syndicate begins its mission where they attack the F.E.A.S.T. building that Boomerang is volunteering at. Beetle leads the Sinister Syndicate in attacking Boomerang. It was stated by Boomerang that he was the one who came up with the Sinister Syndicate name. After getting Aunt May to safety, Peter Parker changes into Spider-Man and helps Boomerang fight the Syndicate. The Syndicate starts doing their formation attack until Spider-Man accidentally sets off Boomerang's gaserang which knocks out Spider-Man enough for the Syndicate to make off with Boomerang. As Beetle has Electro write a proposal on how the Syndicate can use Boomerang as an example to the criminal underworld, Beetle leaves while calling Wilson Fisk that they caught Boomerang, as she is given the information on where the exchange can happen. Scorpia later mentioned to the Syndicate members that Rhino once refused to arm wrestle her. When Beetle returns to the headquarters, Scorpia is present when Mayor Wilson Fisk brings the full force of New York City to their headquarters, demanding that they surrender Boomerang to him. The Syndicate then assists Spider-Man against Mayor Fisk's forces. After Spider-Man evacuates Boomerang, the Syndicate fights Mayor Fisk's forces while not killing them. The Syndicate is defeated and arrested by the police. Their transport is then attacked by an unknown assailant who frees them.

Scorpio

Jake Fury

LMD / Jacques LaPoint

Ecliptic

Mikel Fury

Thanos' Zodiac

Vernon Fury

Scorpion
There are different characters named Scorpion that appear in American comic books published by Marvel Comics.

Mac Gargan

Jim Evans
Jim Evans is a successful apothecary in Dustville during the Old West. He began to date Sarah (the prettiest girl in town) until she began to neglect him upon stating that she already has a boyfriend in Matt Cody. Matt Cody was not pleased that Sarah went out with Jim and challenged him to a shootout. Jim drew his gun first and only managed to wing Matt in the left arm as Matt managed to shoot Jim's gun out of his hand. Matt then made Jim dance with his gun. Jim was humiliated and vowed revenge. Upon inventing a liquid paralytic that he can fire no matter where he would hit them, Jim took on the identity of Scorpion and embarked on a crime spree. Scorpion managed to hold up a stagecoach and the sound of his gun attracted the attention of Rawhide Kid. Rawhide Kid managed to tackle Scorpion who hit Rawhide Kid with a paralytic pellet and continued to rob the stagecoach where he made off with the payroll. Upon questioning the nearby town about Scorpion, Rawhide Kid learned that there had been an apothecary who had been around for four months which allowed Rawhide Kid to determine his identity. Rawhide Kid followed Jim to an abandoned mine, watched him change into Scorpion, and then confronted him. Their fight collapsed the mine and Rawhide Kid fell into an underground stream. Rawhide Kid recovered and went after Scorpion again. When Scorpion fired the paralytic pellet again, Rawhide Kid twisted Scorpion's wrist causing Scorpion to get hit by his own paralytic pellet. Rawhide Kid then turned Scorpion over to Dustville's sheriff.

After six months in jail, Jim Evans managed to mix up a small amount of his stun potion in the prison workshop. He used it on a guard, grabbed his keys, and escaped from jail. Taking on the alias of Sting-Ray, Jim Evans went on another crime spree until he arrived in Bison Bend and decided to settle there as the base of his ultimate destiny as the Emperor of the West. Sting-Ray robbed a bunch of people at Bison Bend's square dance. Clay Riley and Sheriff Ben Brooks tried to stop him, but ended up victims of his stun pellets. Sting-Ray later kidnapped Sheriff Ben Brooks' daughter Natalie holding her hostage until he got the power he demanded. However, he was foiled by Phantom Rider who attacked Sting-Ray. Phantom Rider managed to defeat Sting-Ray and unmasked him after he was distracted by Natalie's shouting. The sheriff and his men arrived and chased after Phantom Rider.

Carmilla Black

Alternate versions of Scorpion

Ultimate Marvel/Peter Parker (clone)
 The first character to be the Ultimate Marvel incarnation of Scorpion is one of Peter Parker's clones. Dressed like a scorpion and attacking the mall, he was revealed to be a mentally unstable clone that was fitted into a green armored suit. This clone additionally had a mechanical tail grafted onto his spine that had the ability to shoot acid. The clone was eventually subdued by Spider-Man and taken to the Fantastic Four who eventually gave it to S.H.I.E.L.D. At the end of the clone saga storyline, Nick Fury tells subordinates to "get to work" while walking out of the room the clone is being held in.

Marvel 2099

Jefferson Davis
 Jefferson Davis takes on the Scorpion name in Earth-65. He wears an electrically charged suit, carries a scorpion-themed staff and possesses some limited super-speed. Jefferson works for the organization S.I.L.K. and fought Spider-Gwen (on behalf of Matt Murdock), Silk, and Spider-Woman.

Scorpion in other media
 A variation of Scorpion appears in Ultimate Spider-Man, initially voiced by Dante Basco and subsequently by Eric Bauza. This version is a composite character with elements of Iron Fist villain Steel Serpent. Furthermore, he initially wields a kusarigama resembling a scorpion tail and wears an outfit resembling the Mortal Kombat character who shares his name. In his first appearance, Scorpion is set to compete against the eponymous character for K'un-L'un's throne. Beforehand, the former travels to New York and poisons his opponent in an attempt to improve his chances. As a result, Iron Fist is forced to appoint Spider-Man as his replacement. During the competition, the web-slinger deduces Scorpion's plan and saves him from a trap that he fell into due to his greed. Scorpion wins the challenge, but Spider-Man is named the winner for selflessness. Enraged, Scorpion tries to attack Iron Fist, but is swiftly defeated and exiled from K'un-Lun by the Elder Monk. Following this, Scorpion joins two incarnations of the Sinister Six and briefly becomes a host of the Venom symbiote, only to be defeated by Spider-Man and his allies across all of his appearances.
 A variation of Scorpion appeared in the 2012 The Amazing Spider-Man film tie-in game. This version is a scorpion-human hybrid created by Oscorp physicist Otto Octavius, who used Dr. Curt Connors' cross-species research to infuse a black fat–tailed scorpion with human DNA and "black goo".
 As of The Amazing Spider-Man 2 film tie-in game, Kraven the Hunter hunted and killed the Scorpion cross-species off-screen before turning it into a mounted trophy.

Scorn

Scorn (Tanis Nieves) is a fictional character appearing in American comic books published by Marvel Comics. Tanis Nevies first appeared in Carnage #1 (December 2010), while the Scorn Symbiote first appeared in Carnage #4 (June 2011).

After the Carnage symbiote was ripped in half by the Sentry outside the Earth's atmosphere, it is later discovered that Carnage survived and returned to Earth, where it was discovered by Michael Hall who brought Shriek and her doctor, Dr. Tanis Nevies, to use Shriek to keep Carnage alive to use the organism's properties to create prosthetic limbs and exo-suits which would respond in the same way as a symbiote. Nevies is outfitted with one of these prosthetic arms after she is caught in an attack by the Doppelganger who tried to rescue Shriek. When near Carnage, her arm goes wild and forces her to kill several scientists before Carnage forcefully bonds to her. After the symbiote uses Tanis to break into a Hall Corporation facility, it is revealed that Cletus Kasady is alive, preserved by Carnage and repaired by Hall's prosthetics. Kasady reclaims Carnage once more, attempting to avenge his captivity, while Spider-Man and Iron Man struggle to stop Carnage. It is then revealed that Carnage was once again 'pregnant', and the suit's spawn briefly bonds to Tanis, but she removes it from herself and the symbiote bonds to Shriek before being torn from her. Scared of Shriek's malice, the symbiote arm then rebonds to Tanis, creating the new hero Scorn who defeats Shriek and forces her to use her sonic shriek to weaken Carnage who escapes.

In Carnage USA, Carnage invaded Doverton, Colorado and bonded to its citizens and the Avengers team (who originally tried to stop Carnage) to which the government send in the Mercury Team, a symbiote-enhanced special forces team bonded to the Agony, Phage, Riot and Lasher symbiotes along with Dr. Tanis Nieves as Scorn to stop Carnage, but they are heavily outnumbered, since Carnage controls the entire town. The enhanced special forces keep fighting, but Carnage sends the controlled Avengers after them, that was when Spider-Man comes with the town's unaffected residents. The melee is particularly fierce when Agent Venom intervenes with sonic rounds. Scorn uses a construction vehicle to carry the two to a device she built and reveals that her device is meant to permanently remove the bonds from Carnage and Venom, but the hosts are still in there. After the symbiotes fight with themselves and the Avengers team, the Venom symbiote finds its way back to Flash Thompson while Scorn is able to capture and contain the Carnage symbiote.

In Carnage Born, it's revealed that Scorn got corrupted and started a cult worshiping Knull. She with her followers retrieve the Grendel symbiote's remnants from the Maker, along with Kasady's damaged body following the Venomized event. After implanting the remnants inside Kasady start to fight for control. She offers herself to Kasady, so he could absorb Carnage's remnants left in her body, but Kasady kills her instead, getting her codex to be Carnage again, though Carnage is actually in Alchemax.

Scorn in other media
 The Scorn symbiote appears in the Spider-Man series finale "Maximum Venom", voiced by Kylee Russell. This version is Venom's older sister who was created by Knull to serve as a member of the Symbiote Sisters (alongside Scream and Mania). Additionally, while possessing a host with super-strength, she possesses shapeshifting capabilities.
 The Tanis Nevies incarnation of Scorn appears as a playable character in Spider-Man Unlimited.

Scourge of the Underworld

Scramble

Scrambler

Grady Scraps
Grady Scraps is a fictional character appearing in American comic books published by Marvel Comics. The character, created by writer Dan Slott and artist Humberto Ramos, first appeared in The Amazing Spider-Man #648 (January 2011). He is Peter Parker's comical co-worker at Max Modell's Horizon Labs. Scraps gets involved in various Spider-Man storylines, such as "Big Time" and "Spider-Island".

Grady Scraps in other media
Grady Scraps appears in Spider-Man, voiced by Scott Menville. This version is a teenage genius, though he still retains his comedic personality.

Nicholas Scratch

Scream

Scribe

Scuzz

Seeker

Selene

Erik Selvig

Señor Muerte / Señor Suerte

Sentinel

Sentry

Kree

Curtis Elkins

Stewart Ward

Robert Reynolds

Val, the Galadorian

Senyaka
Suvik Senyaka is the first ever Sri Lankan character to appear in Marvel Comics, followed by Dr. Amara Perera. Senyaka first appeared in The Uncanny X-Men #300 and was created by Scott Lobdell and John Romita Jr.

Senyaka possesses the power to drain the bio-electrical essence of others upon physical contact. The living energy he drains augments his natural strength, endurance, and reflexes, as well as accelerating his recuperative powers significantly. Senyaka can also utilize the excess life-force he drains to generate a pair of psionic whips composed of bio-electric energy. These whips move according to his mental command and can greatly increase the distance of his absorption ability. The whips can also conduct his bio-electric energy to ignite nerve clusters in an opponent to cause intense pain or paralysis, as well as sear into their flesh.

Senyaka is a mutant recruited by Fabian Cortez as a member of a second group of the Acolytes. On their first mission, this new team of Acolytes attacked the Our Mother of The Sacred Heart school while searching for a mutant child. During the assault, Senyaka displeased his lord Magneto after critically injuring a human nurse with his energy coils and was subsequently slain by Magneto, who crushed the life out of Senyaka with his own coils.

Senyaka survived, however, by siphoning the life energy from agents from the international law enforcement agency known as S.H.I.E.L.D. who had recovered Senyaka's body. Seeking revenge on Magneto, Senyaka set out to kill sea captain Lee Forrester, a former paramour of the self-styled master of magnetism. Forrester teamed up with the mutant soldier from the future named Cable, and Senyaka was seemingly killed once more in the ensuing battle.

Senyaka later reappeared once more as a member of a faction of Acolytes led by Exodus, who has the ability to bring people back to life. The Acolytes participated in an assault on Wundagore Mountain in the European country of Transia, home of the enigmatic scientist known as the High Evolutionary. The Evolutionary had developed a powerful mutagenic compound known as Isotope-E, which the Acolytes coveted for themselves.

After Exodus was defeated, Senyaka found himself amongst the ranks of former Acolytes who were aiding the Carrion Cove rebellion against Magneto's rule of the island nation of Genosha. With the genocide of the Genoshan population at the hands of giant mutant-hunting robot Sentinels controlled by Cassandra Nova, the genetic twin of Professor Charles Xavier, Senyaka was believed dead.

Some time passed before Senyaka would return. Upon his return, the nature of which is still unknown, he joined the ranks of Exodus' new team of Acolytes. Following the X-Men's battle against the Hecatomb, Senyaka appeared on Cable's decimated island nation of Providence alongside new Marauders, Gambit and Sunfire, in an attempt to claim the island's information archives, which would allow access to Cable's future technology. While Gambit and Sunfire faced Cable, Senyaka battled Deadpool and appeared to gain the upper hand before Deadpool was teleported away by Cable's technology.

When Selene dispatches her Inner Circle to retrieve the mystical knife necessary to complete her ritual, Senyaka mortally wounds several mutants with death-related powers. At first, when she tries to fool him by appearing before him as a little girl, he tells her to drop her disguise as he will kill for her because she is different compared to the others he has served. They travel to Selene's birthplace, Rome and New York where they slaughter the members of that branch of the Hellfire Club. After being led to the ruins of Genosha by Caliban, Selene declares this is where she will become a goddess and renames it Necrosha.

When Selene dispatches her Inner Circle to retrieve the mystical knife necessary to complete her ritual, Senyaka mortally wounds Meld, then teams up with Blink to attack Archangel, using his coils to restrain him, while Blink teleports his wings to shreds. Senyaka is later attacked by Wolverine, who drives his claws into his chest. Senyaka is unfazed by this, declaring he has been killed before. In the final fight, Senyaka ensnares Wolverine in his coils, slamming him in to walls. X-23 releases him when she cuts Senyaka's arm off. Wolverine takes advantage of the situation, decapitating Senyaka.

Senyaka in other media
 Senyaka made a cameo appearance in the X-Men episode "Secrets, Not Long Buried". Senyaka is one of the many residents of the mutant-dominated community of Skull Mesa.
 Senyaka first appears in the Wolverine and the X-Men episode "Greetings from Genosha". He is one of the many Acolytes of Magneto. In "Battle Lines", Senyaka and Pyro attack MRD Facility Beta in the Northwest to break out the mutants imprisoned there. He later battles Gambit in "Aces & Eights".

Sepulchre
Sepulchre (also known as Shadow Woman) is a fictional superhero appearing in American comic books published by Marvel Comics. She first appeared in Quasar #45 (April 1993), and was created by Mark Gruenwald and Grant Miehm.

After a difficult childhood, Jillian Marie Woods left home to attend the University of San Francisco. While there, she met occult lecturer Anthony Ludgate Druid, the superhero known as Doctor Druid. They discovered that a psychic link existed between them. Druid probed Jillian's mind and learned her soul had inhabited a male alchemist in King Arthur's court in a past life, and that the alchemist loved a princess whose soul was reincarnated as Dr. Druid. The alchemist and princess were killed by the princess' brother because of their relationship, and the alchemist swore he would find the princess again. Jillian and Druid, surprised by these revelations, became lovers. Sometime later, Jillian accidentally released a demon, which killed her when she and Druid were investigating mystical artifacts Druid took from the sorcerer Magnus. Dr. Druid, using a mystical statue called the Bride of Slorioth, bonded a piece of Jillian's soul to her shadow. When Jillian woke up with her new powers, Druid told her that they were a result of her exposure to the demon.

Jillian took the name Shadow Woman and alongside other heroes Jim Scully (as the second Blazing Skull) and N'Kantu, the Living Mummy, joined a team, led by Dr. Druid called the Shock Troop. When Quagmire, using his Darkforce, Neutron, and the Presence corrupted Earth-148611 (New Universe), Shadow Woman and the Shock Troop helped Quasar fight Anti Bodies until the Shi'ar Imperial Guard destroyed them. Later, the Shock Troop was called on by Doctor Strange to face a threat at the Nexus of All Realities. When the team arrived, the threat had already been neutralized by Quasar.

After Dr. Strange forced Dr. Druid to assume the responsibility of organizing the Secret Defenders, Jillian, Luke Cage and Deadpool were assembled to prevent Malachi from reassembling the Moebius Stone. They met at the Chicago Museum of Art, and confronted Malachi as she attempted to acquire a Moebius Stone fragment attached to a sword. To hold back the Secret Defenders, Malachi animated artwork to attack them and departed with the fragment. Casting her shadow form over them, Shadow Woman caused them to dissipate. Druid then teleported them to his townhouse to seek artifacts which could aid them against Malachi.

They set out to oppose Malachi at a tomb where a corpse held the last fragment of the Moebius Stone in a ring upon its finger. They were joined by Cody Fleisher, Cadaver, a teenager Malachi killed who Agamotto re-animated to serve as his Pale Horseman. However, Malachi obtained the last fragment, and caught Shadow Woman and Dr. Druid with her spells. Shadow Woman was able to phase through her bonds, and distracted Malachi while Dr. Druid escaped. Malachi struck Shadow Woman down, and when she survived the blow, she realized she should not have, and that Dr. Druid had done something to her. Malachi was finally slain by Deadpool, but then Strange, Dr. Strange's servant, attempted to claim the Moebius Stone. Shadow Woman opposed him, only to be struck down again, but Dr. Druid was able to destroy the stone.

Shadow Woman, Cadaver, Dr. Druid and R.G. Mathieson confronted Swarm, as it attempted to control the Rand-Meachum supercollider. Jillian was immune to Swarm due to her powers, and helped free Dr. Druid and Cadaver from the creature's clutches. She and Cadaver helped hold Swarm back long enough for Dr. Druid to convince Swarm to stand down.

Returning from their encounter with Swarm, Jillian asked Dr. Druid to explain to her what she had become. Druid promised to do so, but cast her into the Bride of Slorioth. Within the statue, Jillian encountered the dark side of Dr. Druid's soul, and learned from it what Dr. Druid had done to her. She emerged from the statue furious, and assaulted Dr. Druid, but he convinced her that he had only done what had to be done, and that he was ready to lead her and Cadaver on a mission that would free them all of their respective curses. She agreed, but assumed the new alias of Sepulchre for that mission. Dr. Druid then teleported them to Starkesboro.

Sepulchre and the others met up with Deathlok, Dagger and Drax, their teammates for this mission. Dr. Druid led them to the Gates of Perdition, where he was to confront the demon Slorioth. However, as Dr. Druid departed, the original Defenders — Silver Surfer, Hulk and Sub-Mariner — appeared to oppose the Secret Defenders. Sepulchre engaged the Silver Surfer in battle, but he fled the scene when he realized he was in an era where Galactus's barrier did not surround the Earth. However, the Surfer's conscience gnawed at him, and he returned to engage Sepulchre once more, but she encased him within a field of total darkness. Just then, their battle was interrupted when the demon Slorioth arose.

The two teams of Defenders fought Slorioth, but Sepulchre and Cadaver were taken aside by Joshua Pryce to face the real threat — Dr. Druid, corrupted by his dark side. Dr. Druid claimed that everything he had done had been for Jillian, then attacked his one-time allies. Since Dr. Druid had taken control of her soul, he used that advantage to cause her to dissolve away. Ultimately, Joshua Pryce brought in the Vishanti and Living Tribunal, who drove off Dr. Druid and Slorioth. Pryce then went to help Sepulchre, but she begged him to let her die. He replied, "Better to live, forever a Shadow woman...than to die a Sepulchre!", and helped raise her to life.

Sepulchre and Cadaver met with Pryce afterward, and decided to go their separate ways, but noted that "if the world ever needs saving...and all the good super-heroes are busy," they would meet again.

Sometime later, Lindsay McCabe, a friend of Jessica Drew's, asked Jillian to help her find her missing friend. They were joined by Julia Carpenter, Spider-Woman, who had encountered Jessica's Spider-Woman costume moving of its own accord. Jillian sent the two women to the dimension of the Void-Eater, where Jessica was imprisoned. Re-powered by her costume, Jessica escaped the Void-Eater with Lindsay and Spider-Woman. Jillian closed the portal to the Void-Eater's realm before the creature could follow them back.

Jillian is seen on the phone with a representative from Roxxon Oil, agreeing to speak to them about a job offer they had made. She encounters the Thunderbolts on her way to the interview, and uses her powers to fight off Venom before teaming up with Steel Spider and American Eagle to battle the rest of the team. Managing to reach Roxxon Oil just in time, she negotiates a new life off American soil.

Sepulchre returned to America, following the collapse of Norman Osborn's regime and his Thunderbolts initiative, and was last seen participating in a job interview for a babysitter job with Jessica Jones and Luke Cage, but gets increasingly frustrated with the apparent mispronunciation of her name, repeatedly telling Jones and Cage off and re-spelling her name over and over, which results in her eventual rejection.

Darkforce energy manipulation allows Jillian to fly, generate darkness fields, phase, and merge with shadows.

Sequoia

Serafina

Serpentina

Sersi

Set
Set is the chief deity, a serpent-god or "arch-demon", of the Stygian people in Robert E. Howard's stories of Conan the Barbarian in the Hyborian Age. He is apparently an amalgam of the name of the Egyptian god Set with the appearance/characteristics of both Apep and a monster from Greek mythology known as the Lernaean Hydra.

Set in other media
Set appears in Conan the Adventurer, voiced by Richard Newman. This version is depicted as a giant king cobra.

Seth

Juston Seyfert

Shadow King

Shadow Shell

Shalla-Bal

Shaman

Shamrock

Shang-Chi

Shanna the She-Devil

Karima Shapandar

Shape

Shaper of Worlds

Shard

Miriam Sharpe

Shathra

Shatter

Shatterax

Shatterax (Roco-Bai) was created by Len Kaminski and Paul Ryan and made his first appearance in Iron Man #278 in March 1992.

Roco-Bai was a member of a new breed of Kree cyborg soldiers, dubbed techo-warriors, and he battled the superhero Iron Man during Kree-Shi'ar War. And later, he joined the Starforce.

During the Annihilation: Conquest storyline, he along with Kree were infected by the Phalanx, becoming one of their select and took part on the assault against Adam Warlock, however they failed.

Powers and abilities
He has great strength, speed, durability and energy projection, and he is also a great fighter.

Other versions
Shatterax appears in What If... The Avengers lost Operation Galactic Storm?.

Shatterstar

Jacob Shaw

Sebastian Shaw

Shinobi Shaw

She-Hulk

Jennifer Walters

Lyra

She-Venom

Ann Weying

Patricia Robertson

Sheath
An Inhuman with metal shards protruding from her body.

In Other Media
 She appears as an antagonist in the Marvel Rising franchise.

Shellshock

Shepard

Max Shiffman

Lotus Shinchuko

Wladyslav Shinski

Randall Shire

Shiva

S.H.O.C.
Todd Fields/S.H.O.C. was created by Howard Mackie and John Romita Jr. in Spider-Man #76 (1997).

Todd Fields is the son of Dr. William Fields, who worked for HYDRA in project S.H.O.C. (Sub-dimensional Human-based Occultechnic Conduit). The idea behind it was to use a highly evolved technology connecting to the rather mysterious Darkforce dimension. It was made into an armor by Doctor William Fields, and it has the capabilities of Cloak, as in shadow-melting and projecting the Darkforce energy into the armor to modify its form. Dr. Fields first subject was a man that would come to be known as Loxias Crown, however Crown had his own hidden agenda and killed Dr. Fields along with many other Hydra agents and was planning to use the S.H.O.C.s technology to conquer the world. Todd was a young boy when he witnessed the death of his father, which traumatized him greatly. His father however left Todd with key components for Todd to track and steal another S.H.O.C. armor and bond with it. Todd then became SHOC and swore revenge on Crown for murdering his father.

After Todd saw his father murdered by agents of Hydra, he was devastated. Years later, as a grown man, he would become the new SHOC and a hero. He teamed up with Spider-Man several times and battled Don Fortunato for the whereabouts of Crown, and he was directed to Hammerhead, who informed him that the living vampire Michael Morbius has been captured by Dr. Andrea Janson. Hammerhead killed Dr. Andrea Janson, Crown's lover, to lure him out. During the confrontation, Hammerhead was badly injured and S.H.O.C. figured out a way to defeat Crown, by having him drain the power of the HYDRA's ship, overloading him. Crown later returned as Hunger, a vampire, and battled Blade and Spider-Man. S.H.O.C. however was coming to terms with himself, since the armor was killing him, like it did with Crown.

While trying to get his life straight, Todd was ambushed by the Hand and was killed, only to be resurrected, brainwashed and used as a weapon against Wolverine in Wolverine: Enemy of the State. Luckily, SHIELD was able to stop the influence of Hydra and reverse the brainwash. His memory is slowly recovering, and he has become a hero once more.

The S.H.O.C. armor that he was bonded with allowed him access to high powered weapons that did not require reloading or recharging since it was powered by the Darkforce. He could utilize the combination of technology and mystic energies to enhance his strength, speed, fly (by creating Darkforce wings), teleport, melting into shadows, creating claws and other weapons from his body and shield of Darkforce energies.

S.H.O.C. in other media
 S.H.O.C. is alluded to in the games Spider-Man: Edge of Time and Spider-Man Shattered Dimensions.

Shocker

Shockwave

Shooting Star

Shortpack

Shotgun
Shotgun (J.R. Walker) is a fictional character in the Marvel Universe. The character, created by Ann Nocenti and John Romita Jr., first appeared in Daredevil #271 (October 1989).

J.R. Walker was once a soldier in the United States Army before becoming an assassin working for the CIA. The CIA and Skip Ash sent Shotgun to retrieve a young blonde woman known as Number 9. He wound up battling Daredevil.

He has worked side by side with the Punisher at one point, teaming up to destroy the Carbone crime family. Shotgun had been hired to do this because the Carbone family were not the 'tame' Mafiosi that the government enjoyed. Shotgun saves the lives of the Punisher and ally Mickey Fondozzi. Shotgun and the Punisher then work to slaughter an isolated island full of international Mafia members. This particular battle results in the destruction of most of the Carbone family, with Rosalie Carbone being left in charge.

An athletic man with no superhuman powers, Shotgun is a highly experienced hand-to-hand combatant and an expert marksman with most known firearms. Shotgun wears Kevlar (body armor) for protection. He uses a high-powered recoilless rifle firing a variety of explosive, concussive, combustible and disintegrative ammunition, and also has a specially-designed one-man tank. Shotgun's equipment was designed by Central Intelligence Agency weaponry research and design.

Shrew

Shriek

Shriker
Shriker is a fictional character appearing in American comic books published by Marvel Comics. His alter ego is Jack D'Auria, best friend to Danny Ketch. Jack has extensive martial arts training and has mastered all disciplines.

Jack grew up as a friend of Dan Ketch. He also studied the martial arts under sensei Yugi Watanabe. One day a motorcycle gang entered the garage where Dan and Jack frequented. They were on the run from Mister Hyde, and locked the two up. Dan turned into Ghost Rider and defeated the group as well as Hyde.  Later, Jack and his sensei were targeted by Deathwatch. Jack was injured, and later abducted from the hospital. However, Ghost Rider was able to free him with the help of Yugi's son Brass (Sean Watanabe) and Wolverine. Some time later, Ghost Rider found himself assisted by the mysterious Shriker. Jack eventually revealed that he was Shriker. However, Dan asked him to stay out of the Ghost Rider's conflicts, as things were getting too dangerous.

After the superhero Civil War, Shriker was considered a candidate for the Avengers Initiative. It is unknown if he ever signed up as he was living in Canada and therefore outside of Tony Stark's jurisdiction.

Shroud

Shrunken Bones
Jerry Morgan is a genius in the organic sciences, and worked as a biologist and biochemist before becoming a professional criminal. Morgan experimented in cellular compression, and once succeeded in reducing his own size, using a gas similar to that used by Dr. Henry Pym to reduce his own size. However, a subsequent experiment reduced the size of Morgan's skeleton somewhat, leaving his skin hanging loosely from his bones. Morgan later joined the Headmen in their quest to use their intellectual talents to take control of the world. Dr. Jerold Morgan first appeared in World of Fantasy #11 (April 1958), and was created by Angelo Torres. This story was reprinted in Weird Wonder Tales #7 (December 1974).

Shuma-Gorath

Sibercat
Siberian Tiger (renamed Sibercat in Soviet Super Soldiers #1) was a member of Father Garnoff's mutant underground in Russia. They worked with the original X-Factor to attack the Doppelganger's lab.

Later on, they helped the original mutant Soviet Super-Soldiers escape government capture. A cyborg named Firefox killed most of Illich's teammates, leading him and Father Garnoff to join with their new allies in the Super-Soldiers, forming a group alternately called the Exiles or Siberforce.

Sometime after that, Sibercat was made a member of the Winter Guard when Siberforce and the People's Protectorate merged into a single group. The group battled the Mandarin when his 'Dragon of Heaven' entered Russian airspace.

Sibercat's powers were a therianthropy like transformation into a feline/humanoid form. Sibercat's feline-like mutation gave him heightened strength, speed, agility, endurance, 'catlike' reflexes, enhanced senses, a healing factor, and claws.

Sidewinder

Seth Voelker

Unnamed

Gregory Bryan

Siege

Sif

Sigyn

Silencer

Silly Seal

Silhouette

Silk

Samuel Silke

Silver Dagger

Silver Fox

Silver Sable

Silver Samurai

Kenuichio Harada

Shingen "Shin" Harada

Silver Scorpion
Silver Scorpion (Elizabeth "Betsy" Barstow) first appeared in Daring Mystery Comics #7 (April 1941), during the period fans and historians call the Golden Age of Comic Books, and was created by Harry Sahle. He signed her origin story with the pen name Jewell, which comics historian Michael J. Vassallo believes marks a collaboration with another, unknown artist. She is Marvel Comics' first superheroine, following the antihero character Black Widow, who reaped evildoers' souls for Satan.

Betty Barstow, a secretary for private detective Dan Harley, wore a superhero-style costume to a masquerade ball, and along the way used her jiujitsu skills and investigative acumen to solve a case her employer had turned down. Enjoying it, she continued to be a masked crime fighter. Silver Scorpion is an honorary member of the Invaders. She appeared with the Golden Age Human Torch as a supporting character. She later joined the Liberty Legion.

In the Avengers/Invaders storyline, Spider-Woman (who was actually the Skrull queen Veranke) disguised herself as Silver Scorpion when the Avengers found themselves stuck in the WWII era.

Silver Surfer

Silverclaw

Silvermane

Jemma Simmons

Sin

Sin-Eater

Stanley Carter

Michael G. Engelschwert

Supernatural

Sirocco

Siryn

Sise-Neg

Sise-Neg is a fictional character appearing in American comic books published by Marvel Comics. The character first appears in Marvel Premiere #13 (January 1974) and was created by Steve Englehart, Neal Adams and Frank Brunner.

Sise-Neg (genesis spelled backwards) is a 31st-century sorcerer who attempts to become omnipotent by time traveling back through history and collecting magical energy. While in 18th century Paris impersonating the magician Cagliostro, he encountered Doctor Strange, who was at the time searching for perennial foe Baron Mordo.

Despite opposition from Strange, Sise-Neg travels back to a prehistoric time on Earth when the demon Shuma-Gorath rules, and subsequently banishes the entity. Continuing to journey back in time, Sise-Neg reached the moment prior to the Big Bang that creates the universe and absorbs all the magic in the universe. Originally intending to recreate the universe in his image, Sise-Neg realizes that his quest to achieve godhood was pitiable, as reality is harmony and as it should be. He therefore decides to recreate the universe exactly as it was.

Powers and abilities
Sise-Neg is a sorcerer from the 31st century capable of wielding advanced magics. After absorbing all the magic in the universe, the character is capable of achieving virtually any effect by willing it.

Sister Dagger
Sister Dagger (Zheng Esme), also known as Deadly Dagger, is a fictional character appearing in American comic books published by Marvel Comics. Created by Gene Luen Yang, Dike Ruan, and Phillip Tan, she first appeared in Shang-Chi #1 and was introduced as the younger half-sister of Shang-Chi.

One of the many daughters of the sorcerer and crime lord Zheng Zu, Esme was raised within in father's Five Weapons Society as the Champion the House of the Deadly Dagger outside of Paris. Much like with her siblings and other Society members, Esme was raised in isolation, with her only knowledge of the outside world coming from YouTube.

When Esme's half-sister Sister Hammer names herself as the new Supreme Commander of the Five Weapons Society over its rightful successor, Shang-Chi, Sister Dagger and her half-brother Brother Sabre approach Shang-Chi to usurp Hammer. Shang-Chi reluctantly joins them to free his remaining family from his father's cult.

Although initially cold and hostile to him, Sister Dagger eventually warms to Shang-Chi and tells him her real name.

Sister Dagger helps Shang-Chi defend London from Sister Hammer and her Jiangshi army. After their victory, Shang-Chi is named the new Supreme Commander of the Five Weapons Society and offers Sister Dagger a place at his side, who happily accepts.

While Sister Dagger and Shang-Chi are investigating a rogue Society-operated drug ring in Manhattan, they team up with Spider-Man, a frequent ally and one time martial arts student of Shang-Chi. Despite accepting Spider-Man's assistance, Shang-Chi does not tell him about the Society, much to Sister Dagger's frustration. Spider-Man is severely injured by the actions of the drug ring's leader, a former Society member named King Wild Man and after Sister Dagger accuses him of being ashamed of her, Shang-Chi reluctantly tells Spider-Man the truth about his family and new title. Sister Dagger accompanies Shang-Chi on several more missions, including recruiting their mutant half-sister Zheng Zhilan as the new Sister Staff and rescuing Shang-Chi's mother Jiang Li from the Negative Zone. After Brother Sabre's theft of a Cosmic Cube leads to an altercation between the Five Weapons Society and the Avengers, Shang-Chi hands Brother Sabre over to his superhero allies as a prisoner, which damages his relationship with Sister Dagger.

Despite her anger towards him, Sister Dagger comes to Shang-Chi's aid when his grandfather Chieftain Xin kidnaps Jiang Li and begins targeting anyone possessing Zheng Zu's bloodline. Sister Dagger reunites with Brother Sabre after she and her siblings rescue him from one of Xin's attacks and rescues Sister Hammer from Xin's Qilin Riders. The reunited Champions travel to Jiang Li's and Xin's home dimension, Ta-Lo and back to the House of the Deadly Hand in Chinatown, Manhattan to defend the Five Weapons Society with Jiang Li against Xin and the Riders, who are eventually defeated by Shang-Chi with the Ten Rings. Afterwards, Sister Dagger makes amends with Shang-Chi and returns to the House of the Deadly Dagger. Sister Dagger would continue assisting Shang-Chi and the Society.

Sister Dagger's powers and abilities
Sister Dagger is a highly skilled martial artist, assassin and markswoman, with a preference for daggers and knives.

Sister Dagger in other media
In Shang-Chi and the Legend of the Ten Rings, a character named Xu Xialing appears, portrayed by Meng'er Zhang. She is portrayed as Shang-Chi's sister who holds some resentment towards her brother for leaving her with their father, Wenwu, but reconciles with him. Xialing physically resembles Sister Dagger, possessing a black and white costume, bob cut hairstyle, and a rope dart as her main weapon, similar to Sister Dagger's preference for knives and daggers. She also shares some qualities with Zheng Bao Yu and Sasha Hammer.

Jasper Sitwell

Skaar

Skagg

Skein

Skids

Skin

Skinner
Skinner is a fictional villain appearing in American comic books published by Marvel Comics. The character was created by Howard Mackie and Adam Kubert.

Skinner first appeared in Ghost Rider/Blaze: Spirits of Vengeance issue three, in 1992 and in other series such as Nightstalker and Morbius, the Living Vampire, as part of the "Siege of Darkness" storyline. He later appeared in the limited series Over the Edge

Skinner initially had a violent life, but he tried to abandon this and settled down with a wife, who bore him children. However, his wife Pilgrim and the supervillain Blackout went to his home in an attempt to get him to return to his life of crime. Skinner than embarked on a quest to kill Ghost Rider and Blaze. He encountered them in a diner, and threatened to kill the people inside until Blaze bargained with Skinner that if he fled, Skinner could chase him. Blaze could have fled but instead he waited for Skinner, and the two fought. Here Skinner told Blaze that he had kill his own family so he could be committed to his mother, and so that they could not work for her. Skinner did slay his family so they would escape the attentions of Lilith.

In battle, Blaze repeatedly shot Skinner with his shotgun, until Skinner was only a skeleton. He survived, however, but Ghost Rider arrived and killed him with hellfire. After they left, however, Skinner regenerated.

After this Skinner sought out new humans in order to steal their flesh so that he may appear human again. He decided he would wear his mothers flesh for revenge. He later attempted to kill Blaze and Ghost Rider again, this time by running then over with a stolen truck. A battle then followed, which Blaze would have lost had it not been to intervention from Lilith and Centurious appeared and abducted Blaze and Skinner, leaving Ghost Rider.

Skinner later escaped, only to be captured again, this time by the government, who planned to use him in a research and containment center called the Black Hole. Skinner was operated on so that they could discovered what his flesh was made out of, and the center's supervisor, Spook, was cruel to Skinner and taunted him over the death of his family. Ghost Rider was later imprisoned in the center, which allowed Skinner to escape as well. Skinner then started a prison break, which caused Nick Fury, S.H.I.E.L.D. and the Avengers to come and try to keep the situation under control. During the riot Skinner attacked Ghost Rider. Ghost rider used his penance stare on Skinner, which did weakened Skinner and made Ghost Rider feel the pain of Skinner's victims.

After escaping the Black Hole, Skinner, who pleased by the news of his mother's death, ended his feud with Blaze and Ghost Rider, and no longer pursued then for revenge. He was later captured and imprisoned in the Vault. After its destruction by the U-Foes, however, Skinner escaped and set out on a quest to kill those who he feels are responsible for the death of his family.

Powers and abilities
Skinner is a member of the Lilin species of demons, and as a result he possesses all the abilities which the Lilin possess. He also has superhuman strength, the ability for spikes to appear on his skin which can cut through steel. He can also wear the skin of human victims in order to look like them. He believed to be immortal and invulnerable, demonstrated by how Ghost Rider's Penance Stare failed to have the effect on him it usually has on people.

Skornn

Skrullian Skymaster

Skull the Slayer

Skullbuster

Original

Cylla Markham

Unnamed

Skullfire

Skybolt

Skyhawk

Slab

Margaret Slade

Slapstick

Slash

Vic Slaughter
Victor "Vic" Slaughter is a fictional character appearing in American comic books published by Marvel Comics. The character, created by Len Kaminski, first appeared in Morbius: The Living Vampire #6 (December 1992). A government-trained mercenary, he is a nemesis of Morbius, the Living Vampire, and an enemy of Wolverine.

Slaymaster

Sleeper

Sleeper (HYDRA robot)

Sleeper (Symbiote)

Sleeper was created by writer Mike Costa and artist Mark Bagley and first appeared in Venom #165, while making its first named appearance in Venom: First Host #3.

When the Venom symbiote found out that it was pregnant again, it wanted to take care of its seventh spawn after being cleansed by the Klyntar. The Symbiote kept this a secret to Eddie Brock, until they were captured by the Symbiote Task Force, led by Claire Dixonbe working alongside the Scorpion, who wanted to rebond with the Venom symbiote. Luckily, Spider-Woman came and saved Eddie along with the symbiote from the Task Force. Then Eddie with Venom went to Alchemax to give birth to the new spawn. However, due to the experimentation it went through, the symbiote had a difficult pregnancy and meanwhile Mac Gargan arrived at their location and changed his plan to kill the Venom symbiote and bond to its more powerful spawn. Fortunately, Eddie knocked out both Mac and agent Claire Dixon. After giving birth to the spawn, Eddie and Venom entrusted Liz Allan to take care of the symbiote.

The spawn was then nurtured and raised by its parent who had been visiting at Alchemax to make it good in contrast to its other offsprings. However, after Venom was taken away by its original host, the Kree soldier Tel-Kar, the offspring bonded to Eddie and allied with the Warbride Skrull, M'Lanz, to save Venom and prevent Tel-Kar from using a deadly Skrull bioweapon. During the ensuing fight, Sleeper bonds to M'Lanz to save her, while Venom after being free from Tel-Kar's control rebonded to Eddie, leaving Tel-Kar to be exploded with the Skrull research base by the Kree military. Then Eddie with Venom and Sleeper returned to Earth as M'Lanz returned to space. However, Tel-Kar had survived the explosion and planned to use the bioweapon on the humans, but Sleeper intervened and bonded to Tel-Kar, lobotomizing him in the process and turning him into a body that Sleeper can pilot. After that, Sleeper bid Eddie farewell and with Tel-Kar's spaceship decided to go explore the universe.

Sleepwalker

Slipstream

Sligguth

Sligguth is a fictional character appearing in American comic books published by Marvel Comics.

Slither

Slingshot

Slug

Slyde

Marrina Smallwood

Smart Alec
Smart Alec (Alexander "Alec" Thorne) is a fictional mutant in Marvel Comics, and a member of Alpha Flight. He first appeared in Alpha Flight #1 (August 1983) and was created by John Byrne. He was unidentified in his first appearance, and was not named until Alpha Flight #8.

The character subsequently appears in Alpha Flight #7 (February 1984), #11–13 (June–August 1984), and Alpha Flight Special (1992) in a flashback story.

Alec Thorne was born in London, England. As a mutant, he was contacted by James Hudson to be one of the first members to join Department H. Alec was also one of the first recruits to join The Flight, a precursor to Alpha Flight. In their first mission, they stopped the terrorist known as Egghead from launching a thermonuclear missile at the United States. Later, after Hudson divided the team into three smaller groups, Thorne (as Smart Alec) began training in Gamma Flight.

Some time after Gamma Flight was disbanded, its members were contacted by Jerry Jaxon to join Omega Flight in his bid for vengeance against Hudson. During the fight between Omega Flight and Alpha Flight, Smart Alec was defeated when he looked in Shaman's magical medicine bag; the resulting mental shock shut down his mind. Shaman shrank him down to miniature size and placed him in the bag, until a way could be found to restore his mind.

Snowbird was later forced to kill Sasquatch to vanquish the Great Beast, Tanaraq, who co-inhabited his body. His mind was eventually transferred into Box's robot body. Langkowski's mind eventually entered Thorne's tiny body in an attempt to return to the human world. Thorne's body was finally killed when Langkowski merged his mind into the Box robot to defeat Pestilence, whose freed mind had inhabited the body of Snowbird (who was in the form of Sasquatch at the time), before Langkowski took over the Sasquatch body.

Thorne invented and wore an encephala-helmet, which was used to increase his already super-genius intelligence level and boost his levels of perception (such as seeing across more than the mere visible light spectrum).

Smart Alec appears as part of the "Omega Flight" entry in The Official Handbook of the Marvel Universe Deluxe Edition #9.

Other versions of Smart Alec
Smart Alec appears in What If? #62 (June 1994) titled "What If... Wolverine Battled Weapon X?" He is shown as a member of The Flight before being killed by Guy Desjardins, that reality's version of Weapon X.

Smartship Friday

Smasher

Vril Rokk

Salac Tuur

Unnamed

Izzy Kane

Monster

Smiling Tiger

Smuggler

Alistair Smythe

Spencer Smythe

Snake Marston

Snakes
Snakes is a member of the new UK superhero team The Union. It has been released that Snakes represent Northern Ireland, but Snakes' powers have not been published to the public.

Snapdragon

Snowbird

Tildie Soames

Martin Soap

Solarman

Solarr
Solarr (Silas King) is a fictional supervillain appearing in Marvel Comics. Created by Steve Englehart and Sal Buscema, the character first appeared in Captain America #160.

King was a latent mutant and drug runner whose mutation was catalyzed when he spent several days out in the desert sun after his truck broke down. While recovering from sunstroke and dehydration in the hospital, he realized he could discharge the solar energy he had stored as heat blasts.

Calling himself Solarr, he began a criminal career in New York City, starting with bank robbery. He partnered with Klaw, and became a member of the Emissaries of Evil.

Solarr later battled Daredevil and Spider-Man when he was hired to kill a hitman. The duo defeated Solarr, though the hitman went insane.

He repeatedly met defeat, and was eventually captured and imprisoned at the Project Pegasus research center in New York State, where scientists studied his powers.

One of the other captives and subjects for study at Project Pegasus was Bres, one of the other-dimensional Fomor. Bres began to use his powers to manipulate the staff at the facility, and caused a guard named Harry Winslow to die of heart failure. Bres also freed Solarr from his cell. Solarr hated Winslow, and when he found his corpse, he incinerated it. Bres used his magic to animate the charred corpse, which killed Solarr.

It was later revealed that Solarr was one of the possible targets of Scourge of the Underworld, until Scourge found out that Solarr was already dead.

Solarr was later seen among the revived mutants on Krakoa at the time when the X-Men, Juggernaut, and Deadpool dealt with the Human-Adaptoid.

Solarr in other media
Solarr appears in the X-Men episode "Secrets, Not Long Buried", voiced by Lorne Kennedy. This version is Bill Braddock, the leader of the mutant-supremacist group, Children of the Shadow, and ruler of the mutant and human cohabitation community called Skull Mesa. He is aided by the Toad and an original mutant character named Chet.

Solo

Solomon Kane

Songbird

Candy Southern 
Candace "Candy" Southern is a fictional character appearing in the Marvel Universe. The character, created by Roy Thomas and Werner Roth, first appeared in X-Men #31 in May 1967. She is a former girlfriend of Warren Worthington III. Writer Roy Thomas created her name by combining the last name of author Terry Southern with the first name of the title character of Southern's novel Candy. Within the context of the stories, she partook in many adventures before being killed by Cameron Hodge.

Southpaw

Space Phantom
The Space Phantoms are the servants of Immortus in Marvel Comics.

For many years it was assumed that there was only one Space Phantom, but in the course of the Destiny War the Avengers discovered that there was more than one. During a journey back in time to 1873, a trio of Space Phantoms was caught impersonating the Gunhawks and the Black Rider. The Space Phantoms were previously said to have originated on the planet Phantus, in the Phalbo system in the Milky Way Galaxy.

The first Space Phantom first appeared in The Avengers #2, copying Giant-Man, Iron Man, and Hulk. During his battle with the Avengers, he first copied the Hulk, and battled Iron Man. He took the shape of a flying insect to escape, but Iron Man continued to battle the Hulk. The Space Phantom attacked the Wasp in his insect form, and then became Giant-Man. After fighting Iron Man, he took Iron Man's form. He finally attempted to copy Thor and was banished back to Limbo because his powers could not affect Asgardians.

Since all Space Phantoms appear identical and can appear as any other creature, it can be difficult to determine which Space Phantom did what; the following activities have previously been attributed to the Space Phantom who first encountered the Avengers, but these may not have been the same Space Phantom. A Space Phantom allied with the Grim Reaper and impersonated Madame Hydra, and commanded a division of HYDRA in that identity. The Space Phantom battled the Avengers, but was shunted back into Limbo when he attempted to mimic Rick Jones, who was then linked to Captain Mar-Vell. A Space Phantom was compelled by Immortus to impersonate Mantis to deceive Kang. A Space Phantom attempted to trick Thor into freeing the planet Phantus from Limbo, and allied with Thor to save Phantus, which led to Thor losing much of Mjolnir's power over time. A Space Phantom once encountered Rom in Limbo. A Space Phantom later encountered the Avengers in Limbo. A Space Phantom was used as a pawn by the Young God Calculus in a scheme pitting Spider-Man against the Avengers.

The original Space Phantom is revealed to be disguised as Spider-Man in the Beyond! series.

SP//dr

Spectrum

Speed

Speed Demon

Speedball

Mrs. Spector 
Mrs. Spector is a fictional character appearing in American comic books published by Marvel Comics. She is the mother of Marc Spector/Moon Knight. The character first appeared in Moon Knight #37 (January 1984), created by Alan Zelenetz and Bo Hampton.

Fictional character biography 
Mrs. Spector married Rabbi Elias Spector and had two sons, Marc and Randall. Her husband was disappointed with his boys' violent nature and their obsession with war, he believed that should concentrate on their education, but she dismissed this as boy being boys. When Marc's multiple personalities started manifesting, they interned him at the Putnam Psychiatric Hospital.

Following Elias' passing, Marc was allowed to leave the hospital temporarily to sit shiva. At the reception, she attempted to comfort Marc against his belief that Elias despised him. Marc manifested his alter of Jake to cope, and left to his old room, where he heard Khonshu's voice, and it prompted him to run away.

In other media 
Mrs. Spector called Wendy appears in the Marvel Cinematic Universe television series Moon Knight episode "Asylum", portrayed by Fernanda Andrade. In Marc's memories, his mother became alcoholic and abusive towards him, who blames him for the death of her other son, Randall. After his mother's death, Marc refuses to attend her funeral because of her abuse.

Sphinx

Spider-Girl

May "Mayday" Parker

Anya Corazon

Spider-Ham

Spider King 
The Spider King is a fictional character seen in the 1979 Spider-Woman series. Created by David H. DePatie, Friz Freleng, Lee Gunther, the Spider King debuted in the episode "Return of the Spider-Queen" (December 29, 1979), and voiced by Vic Perrin. This version was leader of an alien race. He believes the Spider-Queen, a long lost leader, is Jessica Drew / Spider-Woman which he brainwashes into believing. The Spider King uses a gargantuan tank for an invasion, but is defeated when his hostage snapped out of his brainwashing and used the Loch Ness Monster to destroy his tank.

Alternate versions of Spider King 
An Earth-616 equivalent (stylized as the Spider-King) is featured in the Spider-Island storyline, created by Dan Slott and Stefano Caselli, and first appeared in The Amazing Spider-Man #666 (July 2011). The Spider-King is a servant extension of Adriana Soria / Spider-Queen (thanks to the Jackal) which is Steve Rogers until being defeated and cured while impersonated by Flash Thompson to gather information.

Spider King in other media 
A variation of the Spider-King appears in Marvel's Spider-Man multi-part episode "Spider-Island" as Norman Osborn (voiced by Josh Keaton) due to his ability to control the Man-Spiders, whom the Jackal uses as a figurehead.

Spider-Man

Peter Parker

Ben Reilly

Miles Morales

Otto Octavius

Pavitr Prabhakar

Spider-Man 2099

Spider-Punk

Spider-Slayer

Spider-UK

Spider-Woman

Jessica Drew

Julia Carpenter

Mattie Franklin

Charlotte Witter

https://avatars.mds.yandex.net/i?id=9b08f88a721a1b2984ddbf18eb00d660_l-5222129-images-thumbs&n=13

Spider-Woman (Charlotte Witter) is a supervillain in the Marvel Universe. The character, created by Howard Mackie and John Byrne, first appeared in The Amazing Spider-Man (vol. 2) #5 (May 1999).

Within the context of the stories, Charlotte Witter is a fashion designer and granddaughter of psychic Madame Web who also engages in black market transactions. Those dealings lead her to work for Doctor Octopus, who mutates her into a human/spider hybrid with the ability to absorb the powers of the previous Spider-Women in return for her agreeing to destroy Spider-Man. She manages to steal the powers of Jessica Drew, Julia Carpenter, Mattie Franklin, and Madame Web, but Franklin reabsorbs the powers and leaves Witter powerless. Witter is defeated and left in a coma in her grandmother's mansion.

Charlotte Witter in other media
 Charlotte appears as a playable character in Spider-Man Unlimited.

Parker Peters

Gwen Stacy of Earth-65

Spidercide

Spike

Darian Elliott

Gary Walsh

Spiral

Spirit of '76

Spirit of Vengeance 

Spirit of Vengeance (Wileaydus Autolycus) is the Ghost Rider from an alternate future of the Marvel Universe and member of the Galactic Guardians.

The character, created by Jim Valentino, first appeared in Guardians of the Galaxy #12 (May 1991) as the inheritor of the Ghost Rider mantle in the alternate timeline/reality Marvel Comics designated as Earth-691. The first appearance of the Spirit of Vengeance aspect of the character was in the following issue, Guardians of the Galaxy #13 (June 1991).

Within the context of the Marvel Comics universe, Wileaydus Autolycus is from the planet Sarka, Tilnast system, a priest of an offshoot of the Universal Church of Truth, and a religious zealot. He first encounters the Guardians of the Galaxy while they are responding to a distress call from Firelord in the Tilnast system. Mistaking the ship as one carrying Black Knights of Truth as reinforcements for the Universal Church of Truth, he undergoes his first transformation into the Spirit of Vengeance and blindly attacks the Guardians. Realizing his error, he sets out to "atone for this transgression" by charging into the heart of the fleet to buy the Guardians time to escape. Instead, the Guardians are captured and brought before the Grand Inquisitor of the Universal Church of Truth on Sarka. The Spirit of Vengeance, with help from Replica, enables the Guardians escape. Before leaving, Vance Astro asks him to join them and consider changing his methods. He declines, saying he preferred to complete his work on Sarka, but that he would think on it as he kills the Grand Inquisitor.

Later, he is among those that respond to Martinex' call for help. He helps the gathered heroes save Martinex' homeworld and becomes one of the founding members of the Galactic Guardians.

Spirit of Vengeance's powers and abilities
The Spirit of Vengeance has the mystic ability to transform into a being with superhuman strength, stamina, and durability, with a head resembling a flaming skull. He can project fire-like mystical energy called either "soulfire" or "hellfire" for various effects. He can create his "Death-Cycle", a flying motorcycle-like vehicle created from the Fires of Kauri and capable of traversing airless space. The Spirit of Vengeance can also fire spike projectiles from his forearms.

Spitfire

Spoilsport

Spoor

Spot

Sprite

Eternal

Kitty Pryde

Jia Jing
Jia Jing is a mutant whose abilities manifested at the end of the Avengers vs. X-Men storyline. She joins Wolverine's Mutant Academy, vowing to become "the greatest X-Man who has ever lived" and to honor the pride her of family and country. Wolverine gives her the code name "Sprite" after Kitty Pryde.

Sprocket

Sputnik

Spyder

Spyke

Spymaster

Unnamed

Nathan Lemon

Sinclair Abbot

Spyne

Squirrel Girl

Squid

Squidboy

Gabriel and Sarah Stacy

George Stacy

Gwen Stacy

Helen Stacy
Helen Stacy is the wife of George Stacy in Marvel Comics. The character, created by Howard Mackie and Dan Fraga, made her sole appearance in Spider-Man #-1 (July 1997). Long before Gwen Stacy met Peter Parker, George and Arthur Stacy were having a barbecue with their respective spouses. Helen was chatting with her sister-in-law Nancy when both brothers' pagers went off, signaling them to go to work immediately. Helen could only laugh with Nancy stating that both of their husbands were similar, something that Helen concurred. Helen made no further appearances in the comics, but in the Gwen Stacy mini-series, it's shown that she had died sometime afterwards, as Gwen kisses a picture of her.

Helen Stacy in other media
Helen Stacy appears in The Amazing Spider-Man and The Amazing Spider-Man 2, portrayed by Kari Coleman. She is happily married to George Stacy and, along with Gwen, has three sons: Philip, Howard and Simon.
Helen Stacy appears in Spidey and His Amazing Friends, voiced by Kari Wahlgren. This version is a detective for the NYPD.

Stacy X

Stained Glass Scarlet

Stallior

Zeke Stane

Star
Star is the name of two fictional characters appearing in American comic books published by Marvel Comics.

Chaste member
Star is a fictional member of the Chaste in Marvel Comics. The character, created by D. G. Chichester and Ron Garney, first appeared in Daredevil #296 (September 1991).

Star had previously trained Elektra albeit in very harsh conditions and under the supervision of Stick. He makes his first proper appearance alongside Wing and Flame in aiding Daredevil take on The Jonin, Izanami and Spear. As his name implies, he is well-equipped with throwing stars. Later, he is seen with his comrades attacking Elektra as they felt that she did not belong in the Chaste, but she simply insults them for being scared of her and Matt's induction.

Star in other media
The Chaste version of Star appears in the second season of Daredevil, played by Laurence Mason. In a flashback, he is a member of the Chaste who worked alongside Stick. When Stick learns that Star is plotting to kill Elektra upon learning she was Black Sky, Stick kills him and flees with her.

Jeanette Rhodes
Jeanette Rhodes is the younger sister of James Rhodes and the mother of Lila Rhodes. The character, created by Christopher Priest and Joe Bennett, first appeared in Crew #1 (May 2003). 

Estranged from her family, she was a crack addict and sex worker before she was killed by gang members.

Ripley Ryan
Ripley Ryan is a human who grew up in a home where she was not treated well by her mother Roberta. She was also bullied a lot growing up. When Ripley became a reporter, she had her first encounter with Carol Danvers when they were attacked by Nuclear Man. He kidnapped Ryan and took her to Roosevelt Island. Carol pursued them with help from Spider-Woman, Echo, and Hazmat. Ripley helped Captain Marvel and her allies defeat Nuclear Man

At some point, Ripley Ryan found out about Doctor Minerva's efforts to engineer humans so that they would become a hybrid of humans and Kree. Ripley volunteered herself to partake in these experiments. The experiment was a success, but Ryan had no superpowers. With help from Doctor Minerva, Ryan utilized the stolen powers from Captain Marvel at the time when she had unleashed a "Kraken" into New York City. When Captain Marvel defeated the "Kraken", she got infected, with her powers being siphoned into Ryan. She became Star, who helped to fight an armada of "Kraken". Star's popularity rose, while Captain Marvel's popularity plummeted. Star later found out about Doctor Minerva's plans to recruit Carol into fighting the possible extinction of the Kree and nearly killed Doctor Minerva with a message left in her own blood stating "You're not as smart as you think you are". Following the attack, Captain Marvel brought Doctor Minerva to Stark Unlimited HQ so that she can get some medical treatment. After learning some information from Doctor Minerva, Captain Marvel went to confront Star in Times Square. As Captain Marvel fought Star, she got weaker due to the Power Siphoners. Captain Marvel ripped the device off her chest, which severed the connection and caused both of them to fall to the ground. Star revealed to Captain Marvel that she released the virus into New York City so that she can draw on the powers of all the New Yorkers. Captain Marvel defeated Star by ripping the Power Siphoner off of Star's chest. While it seemed that she was remanded to the Raft, it turned out that Star had somehow merged with the Reality Gem and escaped.

Star later visited the Bar With No Name, where she got into a fight with Titania. She was defeated due to her inexperience with the Reality Gem and is thrown out where Star was knocked out by Loki. While in a warehouse, Loki attempted to remove the Reality Gem from Star to no avail as he states that other people have come for the Infinity Gems. When Star asks who would come for them, Loki listed a lot of names. Star thanks Loki for the information and attempts to destroy him. Star tries to enlist Jessica Jones to help her, only to be turned down due to recalling what she did to Captain Marvel. Both of them fought until Scarlet Witch broke up the fight and stated to Star that she is destroying reality.

During the "King in Black" storyline, Mayor Wilson Fisk forms his incarnation of the Thunderbolts to escort Star, the current keeper of one of the Infinity Gems, into battle to kill Knull. To do that, they'll first need to make contact with a man Kingpin believes can help turn the tide against the Symbiote god. Star and Mister Fear are able to defeat a Symbiote Dragon. Star and the Thunderbolts make their way to Ravencroft Institute, where the man that would help in defeating Knull turns out to be Norman Osborn.

Star Brand

Kenneth Connell and others

newuniversal

Kevin Connor

Star-Lord

Star Thief

Starbolt

Starbolt is a warrior serving in the Shi'ar Imperial Guard, a multi-ethnic group of super-powered alien beings who act as enforcers of the laws of the Shi'ar Empire. Created by Chris Claremont and Dave Cockrum, the character first appeared in X-Men #107 (October 1977). Like many original members of the Imperial Guard, Starbolt is the analog of a character from DC Comics' Legion of Super-Heroes: in his case Sun Boy (although some sources think his analog is Wildfire). Starbolt can fly and project energy bolts from hands.

Part of the division of the Imperial Guard known as the Superguardians, Starbolt was amongst the first of the Imperial Guard encountered by the team of superhuman mutant adventurers known as the X-Men who sought to rescue the Princess-Majestrix Lilandra from her insane brother, then-Majestor D'ken. Following the orders of their emperor, the Guard clashed with the X-Men on a nameless Shi'ar Empire planet and was on the verge of winning when the band of interstellar freebooters known as the Starjammers arrived to turn the tide of battle in the X-Men's favor. During the clash, Starbolt became enraged when he saw the feral X-Man Wolverine attacking his teammate and then-lover Oracle. After Starbolt flash-fried him, Wolverine quickly took the two lovers out of the fight by slamming them into each other.

Starbolt is featured prominently in an adventure set early in his career; the Guard and the current ruler of the Shi'ar empire are set upon by Skrull assassins and are rescued by the hero later known as Captain Marvel.

Starbolt was also one of eight Imperial Guardsmen chosen to battle the X-Men in a trial by combat over the fate of Phoenix, a primal force of the cosmos that had assumed the form of the X-Man Jean Grey.

Soon after, Starbolt was amongst those few Imperial Guard members who opposed the treacherous Shi'ar High Council member Lord Samédàr, who was aiding an attempted coup of the Shi'ar throne by Deathbird. Even after many of the Guard chose to side with Samédàr, Starbolt remained steadfast in his loyalty to then-Empress Lilandra. These Imperial Guard members went on a mission to find Lilandra, and joined with Nightcrawler and Kitty Pryde in battling Samédàr's renegade Imperial Guardsmen. Starbolt was captured, but was freed on Lilandra's command.

Later, after the formerly-exiled Deathbird had usurped the Shi'ar throne, Starbolt was amongst those Imperial Guard members who clashed with the British team of costumed adventurers known as Excalibur and the Starjammers over the fate of the then-bearer of the cosmic Phoenix Force, the alternate future daughter of Jean Grey named Rachel Summers.

Much later, the intergalactic teleporter Lila Cheney transported the X-Men to the Shi'ar Empire at the behest of then-Empress Deathbird. On Deathbird's behalf, Starbolt and the Imperial Guardsmen battled the X-Men and Starjammers, but the X-Men had arrived in Shi'ar space just in time to see Lilandra regain her throne. Not all was as it seemed, however, as in reality a group of Warskrulls, using technology to allow them to duplicate superpowers, had captured and impersonated the X-Men's founder, the telepathic Professor Charles Xavier, using his telepathy to control Lilandra, and the Imperial Guard, including Starbolt. After the ruse was discovered by the X-Men and all the Warskrull impostors were exposed, Lilandra settled matters with Deathbird, discovering her sister did not want the throne anymore.

During the war between the Shi'ar and Kree Empires, Starbolt was part of a small team of Guardsmen who were charged with preventing the member of the Earth team of super-powered beings known as the Avengers named Quasar from retrieving the legendary Nega-Bands of the Kree warrior Captain Marvel, which had been stolen. Starbolt battled Quasar and Her in space during the Kree-Shi'ar War, although Starbolt was defeated and captured by Quasar.

Subsequently, Starbolt was amongst those Imperial Guard members who defended Lilandra against an assassination attempt by the Kree Ronan the Accuser and his unwilling agents, the royal family of the Earth race known as the Inhumans. He survived the Imperial Guard's battle with Vulcan.

He was one of the view selected to explore "the Fault," but was killed by a group of horrifically mutated creatures from the Cancerverse during "Realm of Kings."

Starbolt in other media
In X-Men, Starbolt appears in The Phoenix Saga and The Dark Phoenix Saga alongside the rest of the Imperial Guard.

Starbolt appeared as a mini-boss in the video game Marvel: Ultimate Alliance, voiced by Beau Weaver. He aids Deathbird in staging a Coup d'état against Lilandra, and fights the heroes alongside Warstar.

Stardust

Starfox

Starhawk

Starlight

Arno Stark

Howard Stark

Howard Anthony Stark

Howard Stark Sr.

Maria Stark

Morgan Stark

Natasha Stark
Natasha Stark, also known as Iron Woman, is a fictional character appearing in American comic books published by Marvel Comics. The character first appeared in Fantastic Four: Dark Reign #2 (April 2009), and was created by Jonathan Hickman and Sean Chen. She is a female counterpart of Tony Stark / Iron Man. In Earth-3490, Iron Woman averted the Civil War between superheroes due to the fact that she and Captain America are romantically involved, and subsequently married.

Other versions of Natasha Stark 
A future showcases Virginia "Ginny" Stark (also known as Black Widow and Madame Masque), the granddaughter of Tony Stark and Pepper Potts and the daughter of Howard Stark III. This version is the leader of a resistance against the Mandarin's empire.

Natasha Stark in other media
A variation of Ginny Stark called Morgan Stark appears in the Marvel Cinematic Universe live-action film Avengers: Endgame (2019), portrayed by Lexi Rabe, and Katherine Langford. This version is the daughter of Tony Stark and Pepper Potts.

Starr the Slayer

Ava Starr
Ava Starr is the Marvel Cinematic Universe’s incarnation of Ghost. Created by Chris McKenna, Erik Sommers, Paul Rudd, Andrew Barrer, and Gabriel Ferrari, the character debuted in the 2018 live-action film Ant-Man and the Wasp, portrayed by Hannah John-Kamen as an adult and RaeLynn Bratten as a child in flashbacks.

In her childhood, Ava was caught in an accident in her father Elihas’ laboratory. The ensuing explosion killed both of her parents, while Ava gained the ability to become intangible as her body was left in a constant state of "molecular disequilibrium". She was recruited by scientist Bill Foster to join S.H.I.E.L.D., where she was trained and given a containment suit to better control her powers. Ava agreed to work for the organization as an assassin and spy under the code name Ghost in exchange for S.H.I.E.L.D.‘s help in finding a way to stabilize her condition. However, she discovered that S.H.I.E.L.D. had no intention of helping her and subsequently went rogue to find a way to cure herself with Foster's help. The two later plan to harness the energy that Janet van Dyne’s body absorbed from the Quantum Realm, putting Ghost in direct conflict with Hank Pym, Hope van Dyne, and Scott Lang. At the end of the film, Janet willingly uses some of her energy to partially stabilize Ava's condition before the latter departs with Foster as Janet's group vow to collect more energy for her.

Ava Starr / Ghost also appears as a playable character in Marvel Puzzle Quest, Marvel Contest of Champions, Marvel: Future Fight, Marvel Avengers Academy, Lego Marvel Super Heroes 2, and Marvel Strike Force.

Trish Starr
Patricia "Trish" Starr is a fictional character appearing in American comic books published by Marvel Comics. The character, created by Mike Friedrich and Herb Trimpe, first appeared in Marvel Feature #5 (June 1972). She is Egghead's niece. Trish is occasionally used as collateral damage during Egghead's schemes towards Hank Pym, including one where she loses her left arm and another involving a bionic replacement.

Starshine

Landra

Brandy Clark

Emma Steed

Steel Serpent

Steel Spider

Steel Wind

Steeplejack

Jake Mallard

Maxwell Plumm

Unnamed

Stegron

Chase Stein

Victor and Janet Stein

Stellaris

Stepford Cuckoos

Steppin' Razor
Steppin' Razor is an enemy of Blade in Marvel Comics. The character, created by Ian Edginton and Douglas H. Wheatley, first appeared in Blade: The Vampire Hunter #4 (October 1994).

Steppin' Razor, a vampire and an ex-crime lord of Jamaican descent, meets and recruits fellow vampire Carl Blake (also known as Night Terror) for a cause, the return of the vampire lord Varnae to the land of the living. Together with voodoo priestess Marie LaVeau, they lure Blade and then mentor "Bible John" Carik to Los Angeles. Their plan is to capture Blade and use his body as the vessel for Varnae's spirit. The attempt fails and in the resulting fight, Night Terror's body becomes the vessel for Varnae instead. All three villains manage to escape in the chaos.

Steppin' Razor in other media
Steppin' Razor appeared in Blade: The Series, played by Bokeem Woodbine. This version is the vampire leader of the Bad Bloods, the Detroit street gang Blade belonged to when he was younger. The episodes Steppin' Razor appears in are "Bloodlines" and "Sacrifice". Blade gets kidnapped by the Bad Bloods. Blade wakes up chained inside a warehouse, in front of him is a man named Father Carlyle. Carlyle reveals that he has hired four men from Blade's past to kidnap him in an effort to bring peace between Blade and the vampire houses. At this point, Steppin' Razor and the other Bad Bloods reveal themselves as the kidnappers and kill Carlyle. Having him at his mercy, Steppin' Razor orders the torture of Blade. He reveals his plan to turn Blade over to the House of Cththon in exchange for membership in that house. This plan fails when a friend of Blade's finds and frees him. Blade then kills all the Bad Bloods except Steppin' Razor, who escapes. Blade tracks Steppin' Razor to Blade's boyhood home, and finds Steppin' Razor holding Blade's father hostage. The resulting fight ends when Blade's father runs Blade's sword through Steppin' Razor, reducing him to ash.

Ella Sterling
Dr. Ella Sterling is a minor character appearing in Marvel Comics. The character, created by Greg Pak and Cory Smith, first appeared in Weapon H #1 (March 2018).

Stick

Stiletto

Farley Stillwell

Stilt-Man

Wilbur Day

Unnamed

Michael Watts

Lady Stilt-Man (Callie Ryan)

Stinger

Wendy Sherman

Stingray

Stinker
Stinker is an anthropomorphic skunk and a friend of Rocket Raccoon and Lylla. He appears in Incredible Hulk #271
(February, 1982)

Stone
Stone is the name of different characters appearing in American comic books published by Marvel Comics.

Pupil of Stick
Stone is Stick's second-in-command and former lover. She can withstand any physical attack as long as she is aware of it in advance.

Hounds version
Stone is a mutant and member of the Hounds who can transform his body into highly dense stone-like material. He was involved in Project: Wideawake and served as Sabretooth's handler.

Mutant
Stone is a mutant with impenetrable rock-like skin and member of the Assassin's Guild. He fought Gambit before being cut to pieces and killed by Wolverine.

Stone in other media
 Stone appears in the Daredevil episode "Stick" portrayed by Jasson Finney and voiced by an uncredited David Sobolov. Stick speaks to him about Matt's role in events to come.
 A different type of Stone appears in Elektra, portrayed by Bob Sapp. This version is a member of the Hand and has skin that is as hard as rocks as well as super-strength. He accompanies Kirigi in his mission to target Abby Miller. Elektra kills Stone by tricking him into walking under a tree that he previously attacked, as Elektra used her weight to bring it down on him.

Kron Stone
There are two different versions of Kron Stone that appear in Marvel Comics and exist in the Marvel 2099 reality. He is the older half-brother of Miguel O'Hara / Spider-Man and eldest son of Tyler Stone.

Original 2099 version
As a child, Kron was continually abused by the android housekeeper, which mistook him for a dog. As a result, he later became a bully, taking enjoyment in other people's pain. The relationship between the two brothers is so conflicted that Miguel tried to kill Kron at one point. In his introduction, Stone ordered Jake Gallows' family to be killed. Gallows found Stone and fatally wounded him with a knife as revenge, before dumping his body into the sewer. As Kron laid dying in the sewer, his body brushed up against a black ball. The ball then bonded to him and formed a new Venom. The symbiote was described as having mutated over the years, and displayed new abilities in this timeline, including acidic blood and saliva. With this new power, Stone sought to emotionally torture Miguel—whom Kron never discovered was his half-brother—by hurting those close, going so far as to kill Miguel's former love Dana—who was also Tyler's lover. After a fight between Spider-Man and Venom, the former emerged as the victor, using loudspeakers to neutralize Venom, who was subsequently taken to the lab for study. It was revealed that the symbiote bonded with Kron on a molecular level, giving Kron an amorphous physiology that allowed his body to take on the properties of the symbiote itself.

Timestorm 2009–2099 version
A variation of Stone appears in the Timestorm 2009–2099 as the alternate Marvel 2099 reality version of Scorpion. Stone was one of Miguel's nightmares during high school, a bully used to do whatever he wanted thanks to the influence of his father ready to solve any trouble the son caused. One evening, Kron was tormenting the lab animals in an Alchemax laboratory, using the powerful instruments found there. While toying with a gene splicer, Stone was attacked by a sudden surge of energy, resulting in an explosion, and his DNA was fused with that of a lab scorpion. The incident transformed Stone in a hulkling and monstrous beast, with his reason lost and the powerful instinct of an arachnid to guide him. Rejected by his father, he becomes obsessed with finding a way to reverse his mutation.

Kron Stone in other media
Kron Stone as the Scorpion appears as a boss in Spider-Man: Shattered Dimensions, voiced by John Kassir. He seeks to steal a fragment of the Tablet of Order and Chaos for Doctor Octopus in exchange for restoring his human form. Along the way, the fragment empowers him, allowing Stone to lay eggs and create offspring that share his deadly abilities. Despite this, Spider-Man is able to defeat him.

Tiberius Stone
Tiberius "Ty" Stone is Tyler Stone's grandfather. An acquaintance of Peter Parker, he was the Kingpin's agent and the Tinkerer's protégé, while his acts of sabotage led to Horizon Labs' destruction and to Alchemax's rise with Normie Osborn's Oscorp stock.

Tiberius Stone in other media
Tiberius Stone appears in the Spider-Man episode "Cloak and Dagger", voiced by Jonathan Brooks. This version visually resembles Tyler Stone and is Alchemax's CEO. He is considered a possible benefactor to Midtown High by Anna Maria Marconi, but is confronted by Cloak and Dagger, who seek revenge on him for experimenting on them. The two destroy his defenses, but the Superior Spider-Man defeats Dagger while Stone defeats Cloak. Stone also tries to attack the Superior Spider-Man to prevent his company's corruption from being exposed, but is subdued by Peter Parker via the Living Brain.

Tyler Stone
Tyler Stone is a fictional character appearing in American comic books published by Marvel Comics. He is a nemesis of Miguel O'Hara / Spider-Man.

He runs the Alchemax Corporation, one of the largest corporate powers in the dystopian 2099 future of Earth. When his promising young employee Miguel O'Hara develops a troubling conscience over testing on humans, Stone has Miguel secretly addicted to the highly potent drug 'Rapture' that he controls to force his compliance. Miguel's successful efforts to rid himself of the addiction create several spider-based powers. Stone hires the corporate mercenary Venture to capture O'Hara, now known by the name Spider-Man. At the same time, Stone is making a deal concerning Latveria's current ruler, Tiger Wylde. The deposing of said ruler also affects the first few issues of the series "Doom 2099". Venture does not succeed in his assignment.

Stone arranges for one of his employees — the assassin and Stark/Fujikawa Corporation field operative known as "The Specialist" — to kidnap Kasey Nash to lure Miguel (as Spider-Man) into battle. The Specialist was an expert martial artist, trained as a samurai warrior, and highly proficient with various martial arts weaponry. However, during the battle with Spider-Man, his throat was accidentally slit as Miguel discovered these new powers included talons.

Stone then fired Public Eye Sgt. Rico Estevez, and reported the failure of his plans to the Alchemax CEO. Stone conferred with Mr. Hikaru of Stark-Fujikawa, and then conferred with Dana D'Angelo. He then plotted against Spider-Man and Stark-Fujikawa. Soon after that, Stone encountered Thanatos for the first time. Thanatos later disrupts Stone's interdimensional piercing program; chasing after an amnesiac super-powered being that becomes swept up in the events. Stone and his girlfriend Dana are assaulted and kidnapped in the course of this adventure. It is later detailed that Thanatos is a corrupted version of the heroic Rick Jones, a longtime associate of the Hulk.

Tyler's son Kron Stone, chronically neglected and physically abused by the family's robot nanny (it believed him to be a dog for a time), grew up to be an amoral murderer. His serial killings take the lives of Jake Gallows' extended family, resulting in his transformation into his era's Punisher. Kron, like many other rich people, has the ability to simply purchase his way out of any legal punishment and does so. This does not save him from death at Jake's hands.

Tyler interrupts his holographic observation of the Alchemax undersea colony rebuilding (Atlanteans had damaged it). He accepts the ashes of his son from his assistant, Winston; then flushes them down the toilet.

Tyler and Kron appear in various flashbacks in the 2099 series that deals with Miguel's education. In one story, he gets into a verbal sparring match with Miguel after Kron is accused of attempted murder.

Kron returns to life through interaction with an alien symbiote. Tyler attempts to have him slain again, but is outmaneuvered.

For a time, the Doctor Doom of this period takes over America and reveals that Tyler is not the true power in Alchemax, it is Avatarr, a mysterious alien being. In a fit of rage, Doom kills Avatarr.

Miguel later infiltrates Tyler's building. He unexpectedly overhears his own mother conversing with Tyler. He then hears he is actually Tyler's son.

Later, Miguel becomes head of Alchemax. He hires his own mother as his personal secretary. Around this time, she shoots and severely wounds Tyler, forcing him to utilize a hover-chair. During his recovery in the hospital, Tyler learns his love Dana had been killed; the murderer turns out to be his son Kron.

Tyler realizes his son has returned to life due to interacting with the Venom symbiote. He attempts to have it slain, but is resisted by the science team overseeing the symbiote's prison cell. Miguel then overrules him. After the funeral of Dana, whom both Miguel and Tyler had slept with, Tyler attempts to bully Miguel, saying he will be reclaiming his office on the next day. Tyler claims this will be done because he is Miguel's father. The man knows this already and has Tyler removed by security.

During Tyler's many attempts to regain control over the company, he recalls it was Mrs. O'Hara who shot him. She again pulls a gun, but Miguel takes the weapon. Tyler states he has always known O'Hara has been Spider-Man. Miguel fires three shots. It is revealed Tyler was utilizing a holographic projection. When questioned on if he knew it was projection before firing, Miguel says, "I hope so."

Undersea invaders rampage through New York as revenge for Alchemax threatening to remove them from the city of New Atlantis. The leader Roman flooded the city of New York, and summoned the monster Giganto, who had originally appeared decades ago. This starts an evacuation of the city. Tyler is shot to death by General Dagin of the Atlantean Army. Mrs. O'Hara also perishes in the conflict. Stone's Mars Colony, called 'Project: Ares', becomes one of the last two outposts of humanity, the Savage Land being the other. This is detailed in the series 2099: World of Tomorrow.

Tyler Stone is revealed to be the grandson of Tiberius Stone.

Stonecutter

Stoneface
Stoneface is a feared crime boss and enemy to the Falcon. During his time as the crime lord of Harlem, Stoneface was brought down by a Superhero team of Sam Wilson, Captain America, and Spider-Man. Stoneface's territory in Harlem was then ceded to his former colleague Morgan. As a courtesy, Morgan helped exile Stoneface into friendly confines out of the United States in Lagos, Nigeria. Unfortunately for Stoneface, when he kidnapped a visiting Leila Taylor he came into conflict with again with the Falcon, who was assisted this time by the Black Panther.

Stonewall

Louis Hamilton

Jerry Sledge

Storm

Franklin Storm

Stranger

Gene Strausser

Straw Man

Striker

Striker is a super powered teen in the Marvel Comics universe.

The character, created by Christos Gage and Mike McKone, first appeared in Avengers Academy #1 (June 2010).

Within the context of the stories, Striker becomes a child actor at a young age and is molested by his manager. During an encounter, Striker's power of electrical manipulation manifests. Norman Osborn offers Striker whatever he wants in exchange for the use of his powers. Striker is recruited into the Avengers Academy along with five other students who have been affected by Osborn. He uses this opportunity to become famous again. He, Veil, and Hazmat then hunt down The Hood and videotape him screaming for mercy under electric torture. The video gets thousands of likes on YouTube, but at first Tigra is disgusted and actually requests the teen get expelled. Hank convinces her to allow the kids to remain, to which she grudgingly agrees, but secretly she relishes in watching the video of Hood screaming. Later, the team fights Korvac with the bodies and strength of their older selves. A mature Striker is killed by Korvac's blast, but is then reverted to his younger self by Korvac's estranged wife, Carina. Striker has an emotional breakdown after experiencing death. After a pep talk from Tigra, he is better able to control his powers and does not fear death. He also hatches a plan to save the students from Absorbing Man and Titania's attack on the Infinity Mansion. Later on, he reveals to Julie Power that he thinks he is gay. He soon publicly announces his sexual orientation in a press conference, showing Julie his fame hungry side.

He was later scarred in the face by Jeremy Briggs when the academy kids tried to stop him from releasing a superhuman cure. At the series' conclusion, he goes on a date with another teenage boy, even turning off his phone and ignoring his mother's urgings. The faculty then announce that Striker and the others have graduated the academy. Striker later appears in Avengers Undercover, where he and Finesse visit Hazmat in the S.H.I.E.L.D. detention center after Hazmat kills Arcade.

Striker later appeared as part of a new program established by Leonardo da Vinci to replace the defunct S.H.I.E.L.D. He is seen sparring with Reptil.

Striker in other media
 Striker appears as a playable character in Lego Marvel's Avengers.

Stringfellow

Strobe

Mendel Stromm

Strong Guy

Strongman

Bruce Olafsen

Percy van Norton

Spider-Squad

Simon Stroud
Simon Stroud is a fictional character appearing in American comic books published by Marvel Comics. Created by Doug Moench and George Tuska, the character first appeared in Creatures on the Loose #30 (April 1974). A mercenary trained by the CIA, Stroud has worked alongside Spider-Man and Black Widow, and has gone after John Jameson / Man-Wolf, and Morbius, the Living Vampire.

Simon Stroud in other media
Simon Stroud appears in the 2022 film Morbius, portrayed by Tyrese Gibson. This version is an FBI agent equipped with a cybernetic arm.

Stryfe

William Stryker

Alistaire Stuart 

Alistaire Stuart and his sister Alysande are the founding members of the Weird Happenings Organization in the Marvel Universe. The character, created by Chris Claremont and Alan Davis, first appeared in The Uncanny X-Men.

Within the context of the stories, Alistaire is part of a British Government organization which investigates supernatural and superhuman incidents.

The character is most probably based on Brigadier Lethbridge-Stewart of Doctor Who. During the time of his early appearances, Marvel was printing Doctor Who Magazine.

Alysande Stuart 

Alysande Stuart and her brother Alistaire are the founding members of the Weird Happenings Organization in the Marvel Universe. The character, created by Chris Claremont and Alan Davis, first appeared in Excalibur #6 in March 1989.

Within the context of the stories, Alysande is part of a British Government organization which investigates supernatural and superhuman incidents.

Stuntmaster

George Smith

Steve Brooks

Kid Stunt-Master

Styx and Stone

Subbie
Subbie is an amphibious boy who grew up in the depths of the ocean, and appeared in Kid Komics #1–2.

Sublime
Sublime (also known as John Sublime), is a supervillain (a sentient bacterium). The character is usually depicted as an enemy of the X-Men, and first appeared in the New X-Men Annual 2001. As Dr. John Sublime, Sublime is the self-appointed name of a sentient bacterial life form that arose during the beginnings of life on Earth. With the rise of multicellular lifeforms, Sublime found endless numbers of hosts it could infect. Sublime is not a typical sapient but a sentient microscopic bacterial colony that can possess the body of any living organism, and manipulate both psyche and physical appearance. Other abilities include mass mind control, personal genetic manipulation (which allows for accelerated healing), cellular shapeshifting, as well as performing any number of power enhancements.

It was hinted that the very hatred and fear of mutants was caused by Sublime itself. But the bacteria took more direct actions to ensure that the mutant population would be held in check, if not exterminated, to keep it from becoming the dominant species of the planet.

The first step was the Weapon Plus Project. Sublime took over a human body, dubbed Dr. John Sublime, and became the director of the Program, overseeing the creation of living weapons created by each installation of the program, from Captain America (Weapon I) to the Super-Sentinels – Fantomex, Huntsman, and Ultimaton (Weapon XIII, Weapon XII, and Weapon XV), passing through Nuke, Wolverine, and Deadpool, the latter two originating in the Weapon X Project, seemingly the most prolific living weapons producer.

For many years, Sublime remained behind the scenes, manipulating the Weapon Plus Project and installing Malcolm Colcord as the Director of Weapon X, which would eventually lead to the so-called War of the Programs between Colcord's replacement, Agent Brent Jackson, and Sublime, as Weapon X became an independent organization.

As millions of mutants were born worldwide, Sublime, still under the identity of John Sublime, took other steps to ensure the extermination of mutantkind. One of these steps was the creation of the TransSpecies Movement a.k.a. Homo Perfectus, a cult of humans that sought to empower themselves by grafting mutant body parts to their own bodies, but outwardly a group of 'mutants born in human bodies'. The militant faction of this group, the U-Men, refused to have any sort of contact with the world, which they considered impure, for which they sealed themselves in containment suits.

During a trip to Hong Kong's new office of the X-Corporation to investigate the murder of Risque, the X-Men discovered Sublime's farm of mutant prisoners. They were being harvested for mutant body parts which could give the U-Men powers. Sublime, who was in the country on a book tour, thus became aware of the X-Men's immediate threat to his plans. Sublime also tried to purchase the mutant healer Xorn in one such prison in China.

Although Xorn was rescued by the X-Men, he was a mole. Xorn, who was revealed to apparently be Magneto, became addicted to the drug "Kick", made from concentrated doses of Sublime's body. Xorn dealt the drug to Quentin Quire, thus placing Quire under Sublime's influence, which would cause the Open Day Riots made by the Omega Gang, and which led to the death of Sophie of the Stepford Cuckoos and Dummy, the bodiless, gaseous-form student of Xorn.

Meanwhile, Sublime and the U-Men spread their influence to New York City, where they kidnapped the telepath Martha Johansson, harvested her still-living brain, and used it as a weapon against the X-Men. Cyclops and Emma Frost, the White Queen, were kidnapped and tortured. They were sent off to be dissected, but escaped and confronted Sublime in his office. Emma, angry, held Sublime off a high ledge. Johansson forced Sublime to fall from Emma Frost's grip to his apparent death. The Sublime organism survived, regenerated its host body, and returned to actively overseeing Weapon Plus, as always, from the shadows.

Sublime suffered a setback in its plans with the destruction of two of Weapon Plus' Super-Sentinels (Huntsman/Weapon XII and Ultimaton/Weapon XV) and the defection of Fantomex (Weapon XIII). Sublime had envisioned a team of mutant-hunters with scripted actions operating from a space station (a section of Asteroid M) to make the genocide of mutantkind look like a "Saturday morning cartoon come to life". Weapon XII had already been destroyed during its test-drive; Fantomex, intended to be the smart, cool member of the team, refused to be anybody's weapon. Only Ultimaton remained, and even though he followed the direction of Weapon Plus operatives, he had begun to question his role as a slaughter machine but was ultimately killed by Wolverine.

Under the influence of Sublime via Kick, Xorn revealed himself to be Magneto, and assembled a new Brotherhood of Mutants to lay waste to the Xavier Institute and then New York City. They were defeated by the X-Men, but Xorn-Magneto, under Sublime's influence, killed Jean Grey, who was manifesting the powers of the Phoenix Force. Unbeknownst to all, the Phoenix was the ultimate threat to Sublime's plan. In retaliation for Jean's murder, Xorn-Magneto was beheaded by Wolverine.

Later, Chamber, an X-Man who had infiltrated Colcord's Weapon X organization, was ordered to assassinate Sublime by Brent Jackson, an S.H.I.E.L.D. agent turned Weapon X field leader. Chamber incinerated Sublime, but Sublime again regenerated. At the same time, Sublime was also responsible for sending Sabretooth against Mister Sinister to obtain Sinister's latest creations, the Children (not to be confused with the Children of the Vault, a thematically similar team of characters but different in origin).

With the massive depowering of mutants following the House of M, mutantkind's threat to Sublime has been greatly diminished. However, it remains to be seen if the depowered mutants lost their innate immunity to the Sublime infection. In any event, Sublime appears as a computer-generated image and personality in X-Men: Phoenix - Warsong where he greets the remaining Stepford Cuckoos at The World, the base of operations for the Weapon Plus. He confirms that the Cuckoos are part of the larger Weapon XIV, the "Thousand-in-One," a telepathic gestalt of one thousand cloned daughters based on the ova of Emma Frost, taken by John Sublime years earlier when she was comatose. He facilitates the transfer of the Phoenix Force into all one thousand clones and uses robots to stop the X-Men, though "he" is defeated.

Sublime was responsible for the birth of the Stepford Cuckoos, extracting thousands of eggs from the ovaries of Emma Frost and harvesting them into humanoid/nanite hybrids designed to be killing machines. The hub of his program, the five sisters, were sent to the Xavier institute to be trained in the use of their telepathic legacy.

John Sublime returned in a new human host and surrendered himself to the X-Men, hoping they could fight his sister, Arkea.

The Origins of Sublime and Arkea
With the rise of Krakoa as a mutant nation, the X-Men have discovered plenty of secrets about the mutant race including the means to resurrect some of the oldest mutants in all existence. Thanks to their successful battle against the Crimson Kin and brief trip into the past, the team was able to recover a time-drive containing the last of the original mutants known as Thresholders. With the help of the time-displaced Cerebra, the team is able to resurrect Amass, a young "Enriched" who had the ability to fuse themselves with others. This also allowed them to save the hedonistic Crave and their leader, Theia. The three reveal to the Marauders that they were among the last of Threshold, the first ancient mutant civilization. They coexisted with early humans, whose wisdom served as a crucial check in the Enriched culture. But an ancient water-based species known as the Unbreathing went to war with the Enriched. Their increasingly dark plans resulted in the creation of biological weapons and hybrid bacteria which became self-aware and turned against the culture. The massively powerful psychic Cassandra Nova reveals that she's glimpsed into their minds, and confirms that the bacteria they created are actually Sublime and his sister, Arkea.

Soon afterwards, several of Krakoa's young mutants and their mentor Wolfsbane are kidnaped by the U-Men at a peaceful rally, much to the dismay of Cerebella who has intense trauma related to the evil U-Men. As Escapade, the newest edition to Krakoa's New Mutants crew, attempts to break the group out of their cage, John Sublime makes an appearance, threatening the group and holding the glass jar that Martha's brain was originally held in, with the clear intention of turning her back into a floating brain at his service.

Alternate versions of Sublime
In the Here Comes Tomorrow timeline, after Jean Grey's death and Xorn's apparent death, Professor X left the Xavier Institute to rebuild the island of Genosha, and a broken Cyclops declined Emma Frost's offer to jointly run the Xavier Institute. The new Beast became the new Headmaster and faced many troubles in his attempt to teach new generations of mutants and to fight for the Dream. The stress resulted in Hank consuming Kick and, subsequently, becoming the new host for Sublime. In this new host body, Sublime waged a war against mutant kind and the X-Men, destroying the Xavier Institute in the process.

Sublime in other media
Sublime appears in Marvel Anime: X-Men, voiced by Troy Baker in the English dubbed version. This version is a white-haired human with a mechanical eye that is associated with the U-Men. He and the U-Men member Kick were abducting mutants to harvest their organs. After the X-Men had killed Kick, Sublime later ambushes them in the mountains while piloting a robotic armor that can use the X-Men's powers against them. Beast manages to find the robotic armor's weak point, allowing the others to defeat him. They discover that he has a mutant detection device before Sublime self-destructs himself.

John Sublime appears in the video game X-Men: Destiny, voiced by Joel Spence. John Sublime is shown to be associated with the U-Men. He transforms into a gigantic monster after injecting himself with a serum of concentrated "X-Genes" that grants him mutant powers. Sublime presumably dies in the ensuing fight.

Subterranea

Sugar Man
Sugar Man is a mutant villain created by writer Scott Lobdell and artist Chris Bachalo, and first appeared in Generation Next #2 (April 1995).

Sugar Man first appeared during "Age of Apocalypse", an event that caused Marvel Universe's history to diverge. Although many of the storyline's characters were alternate versions of existing heroes and villains, Sugar Man does not appear to have an Earth-616 counterpart.

Fictional character biography

Age of Apocalypse 
Sugar Man hails from the dystopian reality of the Age of Apocalypse, where Apocalypse conquered North America and set up a system in which mutants ruled. Little to nothing is known about this twisted figure's childhood. With his grotesque appearance and psychotic personality, Sugar Man quickly earned himself a reputation as a brilliant geneticist, as well as a sadistic torturer under Mister Sinister's direction, and like his teacher, Sugar Man so too had built secret labs all over North America, with one at Niagara Falls where he regularly torments his human slaves.

Sugar Man was later placed in charge of Pacific Northwest's human slave camp, the "Seattle Core". Magneto needed a mutant with time travel powers to go back in time to restore reality's proper order before Charles Xavier's death, whose existence was revealed by Bishop, a displaced mutant from Earth-616. Apocalypse had already killed all mutants with chrono-variant powers to prevent anyone from undermining his regime, but Know-It-All was able to locate one with latent powers: Illyana Rasputin, the sister of Generation Next's leader, Colossus.

Magneto sends the fledgling group, Generation Next, to the Core in an attempt to rescue her. During their mission, Sugar Man encounters and kills several of the members, including Vincente and Mondo. During the process, Sugar Man is seemingly destroyed. In reality, however, he lost most of his mass and shrank to a minuscule size. He hides in Colossus' boot during the assault on Apocalypse's citadel.

In the 2000 Blink limited series, a flashback reveals that Sugar Man was once the jailer in charge of cellmates Illyana Rasputin and Blink (before she was rescued as a young girl by Weapon-X and Sabretooth) in a prison facility where he regularly experiments with them.

Arrival in Earth-616 
During the assault on Apocalypse's citadel, Sugar Man takes advantage of the chaos to escape by jumping into the M'Kraan Crystal, the "Nexus of all realities". He arrives in the Earth-616 timeline, arriving in an unspecified location some twenty years in the past. With no apparent counterpart in this universe and no-one to remember him, Sugar Man travels to Genosha where he continues his genetics work behind the scenes. At some point, he approached Dr. David Moreau, a scientist who lived and worked on Genosha. Using techniques developed in his home reality, the Sugar Man sold his work on the Mutate bonding process to Dr. Moreau. Dr. Moreau, who would go on to be called the Genegineer, used the process to turn the mutant inhabitants of Genosha into mindless slaves. Years later, when the X-Men helped topple Dr. Moreau and the Genoshan government, ending the enslavement of mutants, they remained completely unaware of the existence of the Sugar Man or his role in the creation of the Mutate process. As the months and years passed, the Sugar Man quietly orchestrated things in his favor during the more peaceful government run by Sasha Ryan.

Eventually, this government falls into a brutal civil war. When the mutant team Excalibur is investigating the first Mutate slave of Genosha, they almost learn the secret of the Sugar Man; however, this is thwarted when Sugar Man activates a device that kills the Mutate before his involvement can be revealed. When Excalibur continues to keep searching for the secret history of Genosha, Sugar Man prevents them by destroying the master computer holding the information.

Operating from the Shadows 
Detecting that X-Man, another refugee from Earth-295, is active in Earth-616, Sugar-Man sends his agent Rex to eliminate him to maintain his anonymity. Much to his frustration, the first assassination attempt is interrupted by Selene. Sugar Man then attempts to capture Alex Summers, using a copycat of the deceased Scarlet McKenzie as his operative. She fails, and he eventually gives up after learning that another refugee from "The Age of Apocalypse", Beast, now calling himself "Dark Beast", is also trying to capture him.

When Nate Grey's Earth-616 counterpart, Cable, travels to Genosha and becomes involved, his presence was picked up by Sugar Man who mistook him for his Earth-295 counterpart and incorrectly figured Nate Grey had come after him following their recent altercation. He made arrangements for the Press Gang to attack and kill "X-Man" and his associates. Sugar Man pleasantly realizes that "X-Man" was actually an older version of the Nate Grey he knew. When Cable tried to stop him telepathically, he was overwhelmed by the transtemporal jumble that still existed within Sugar Man's mind. Aware he was fighting a losing battle and eager to cover his tracks, Sugar Man initiated meltdown procedures for the nuclear core powering his base. As Cable, Domino, Jenny Ransome, Phillip Moreau, and the brainwashed ex-Magistrate Pipeline try to deactivate the bomb, Sugar Man used the confusion and fear to escape, only to be opposed by Philip Moreau. Stunning him with stories of how he and his father created the mutate bonding process, Sugar Man abducted Philip and teleported out of sight. Sugar Man's plans for Phillip remain unknown. With the database destroyed, Sugar Man's existence is kept secret. The clues themselves were passed to Phillip by Mister Sinister, who had long suspected that the Genosha mutate process was based on his own genetic research.

After nearly coming face-to-face with 616's Mr. Sinister in Genosha, Sugar-Man begins working with the Dark Beast to keep their existence secret: Sinister learning that they are the ones who are using his techniques in 616 would work against them. In this vein, they target Bishop, who retains memories from the Age of Apocalypse. After the failed attempt to slay Bishop by using the Dark Beast's operative Fatale, the two refugees part company.

Return to the Age of Apocalypse 
Sugar Man returns to Earth-295's past Earth-295 by utilizing a hyper dimensional device. After succeeding, he quickly resumes experimentation on a super-virus that he hopes to bring back to Earth-616 to wipe out humanity. Unfortunately for Sugar Man, Nate Grey follows him and, with the help of Magneto and Forge, thwarts his plot and sends him back to Earth-616.

The Fall of Genosha 
Back in 616, Sugar Man and the other refugees from Earth-295 are targeted by the Shi'ar empire, who see Holocaust's embedded shard of the M'Kraan Crystal as sacrilege. When the shard is removed, all refugees are sent back to Earth.

Afterward, Genosha is quickly destroyed by the wild Sentinel, directed by Cassandra Nova. The whereabouts of Sugar Man are unknown until he reappears in Genosha, killing a band of Magistrates who are exploring the island with the Dark Beast. Callisto and Karima Shapandar confront Sugar Man and apparently kill him with a pipe through the head.

Endangered Species 
He recovers from Calisto's attack and is one of the villains contacted by Beast when he is trying to reverse the effects of M-Day. Sugar Man declines, saying that Beast can not afford him.

Recent activities 
After Dark Reign, Sugar Man leaves his hideout to find the device known as the "Omega Machine". He finds the device in an abandoned H.A.M.M.E.R. facility with, to his delight, Nate Grey hooked up to it. He remakes the device to open portals to other realities and begins creating technologically derived mutates as part of his experiments while he tries to reach Earth-295, the Age of Apocalypse. Realizing that the only way Sugar Man will leave him alone is to give him what he wanted, Nate uses all of his strength and willpower to open a portal to 295; before Sugar Man can escape into it, he is forced to return to 616 by Moonstar, where he is taken into custody by Captain Steve Rogers.

Return to the Age of Apocalypse
Sugar Man is released from prison by Dark Beast. They rebuild the dimensional portal technology and return to the Age of Apocalypse, where the two use the energies of the life seed to resurrect a number of fallen mutants to provide Weapon Omega an army.

The Human Resistance later captures Sugar Man and gives him to Penance in exchange for her co-operation. Penance plans to reform Sugar Man and utilize his science in her reformation of society.

Secret Wars 
Sugar Man was believed to have stayed on the Age of Apocalypse when the reality was closed from the Multiverse during the X-Termination event, but in the lead-up to the incursion between the Earth-616 Earth and Earth-1610 as seen in the Secret Wars storyline, he had managed to return to Earth-616 before its closure and has been in hiding since then. Believing that the villain has the means to boost his magnetic abilities, Magneto seeks him out. Sugar Man is able to unveil a set of mobile power amplifiers with the intention of selling them to Magneto. Magneto, however, takes the technology violently and impales Sugar Man with numerous metal pipes, leaving him barely alive.

Apocalypse Wars 
While investigating the mysterious appearance of 600 new mutant signatures, Colossus takes a group of younger mutants to investigate. During the investigation, they discover that Sugar Man has created the new mutants and plans on traveling to the future with them where he will raise and control them, but are able to thwarted his plans.

Sugar Man was also revealed to be associated with Chance and his airborne casino for criminals, the Palace.

Death 
Bishop, later receives a warning about an unspecified, imminent event that would have catastrophic consequences on the X-Men's timeline which lead him to Sugar Man's lab where the X-Man had a quick confrontation with the frightened villain before getting knocked unconscious. By the time Bishop woke up, Sugar Man was dead, with his body split in two.

Powers and abilities
Sugar Man is a mutant who possesses superhuman strength, four arms, hands with razor-sharp claws, a giant mouth full of razor-sharp teeth, and a dense, razor-sharp tongue of indeterminate length that fused with bio-energy able to pierce and damage stone, steel, and even non-solid objects such as gas and liquid. It is unknown if all of his abilities, as well as his bizarre physical appearance, are a natural part of his mutation, or later additions through genetic tampering.

He has an enhanced sense of smell and can use it to detect fear.

He can control his own body size and mass.

Sugar Man also possesses advanced regenerative abilities.

Sugar Man is an expert, at least by modern standards, in sciences including biology and genetics.

Other versions

X-Babies
In the dimension ruled by Mojo, Dazzler encounters childlike versions of the Age of Apocalypse villains, including Sugar Man. These entities seem to be created by Mojo himself, though he has lost control of them.

Sugar Man In other media
 Sugar Man appears in X-Men Legends II: Rise of Apocalypse, voiced by James Arnold Taylor. Sugar Man is a boss that appears as the supervisor of the Core. Sugar Man reveals that he is the same Sugar Man from the Age of Apocalypse (although this claim can be debated) and expresses admiration for how Apocalypse manages to conquer the world and run it effectively no matter what timeline he is in. He also compliments Apocalypse as a good boss. It is unexplained how Sugar Man managed to reach this timeline from the Age of Apocalypse.
 Sugar Man appears as a boss in Marvel: Avengers Alliance, Season 2, Mission 1.

Sui-San

Hope Summers

Rachel Summers

Ruby Summers

Lin Sun

Sun Girl

Mary Mitchell

Selah Burke

Sunder 

Sunder (Mark Hallett) is a mutant in the Marvel Universe, a member of the Morlocks. The character, created by Chris Claremont and Paul Smith, first appeared in The Uncanny X-Men #169 (May 1983).

Within the context of the stories, Sunder's mutant powers give him superhuman strength, stamina and durability. He is a founding member of the Morlocks, abandoning the identity he had in the surface human world. Sunder is the aide to Callisto, the muscle of his group who is very protective of them, especially Callisto. On Callisto's orders, he kidnaps Angel to the realm of the Morlocks. He later aids Callisto in abducting Kitty Pryde and attempting to force Pryde to marry the Morlock Caliban. He also serves the wizard Kulan Gath when he took over Manhattan. Some time later, he took up residence on Muir Island. He briefly joins the "Muir Island" X-Men organized by Moira MacTaggert, but is killed by the cyborg Pretty-Boy with a bullet wound in the back when the Reavers invade Muir Island.

Other versions of Sunder
 In the alternate Age of Apocalypse reality, Sunder is known as Brute and is a member of the Outcasts, alongside Nate Grey. He is killed by Mister Sinister.
 In the House of M timeline, Sunder is seen as a member of the Genoshan Black Ops version of the Marauders.
 Sunder is introduced to the Ultimate Marvel Universe as the leader of the Ultimate Morlocks. His desire to fight and kill any perceived threat, instead of using diplomatic means, results in his demotion as leader and replacement by Nightcrawler. He is forced to bring some innocent mutants to Mister Sinister.
 The X-Men: Evolution comic, based on the show of the same name, features Sunder as one of the Morlocks.

Sunder in other media
Sunder appears alongside the Morlocks in X-Men, voiced by Dan Hennessey.

Sunfire

Sunpyre

Sunspot

Sunturion

Super-Adaptoid

Super-Patriot

Super Rabbit

Super Sabre

Super-Skrull

Supergiant

Superia

Superior

Supernaut

Supernova

Supreme Intelligence

Supreme Leader 
Supreme Leader, also known as Steve Rogers/Captain America, Civil Warrior, Captain Hydra and Hydra Cap, is a fictional character appearing in American comic books published by Marvel Comics. The character first appeared in Captain America: Sam Wilson #7 (March 2016), and was created by Nick Spencer and Daniel Acuña. He is a counterpart of Steve Rogers/Captain America. Apparently revealed to have been a double-agent of Hydra since his early youth, it's revealed to be the result of Kobik manuiplated by the Red Skull that Hydra was good for the world and Kobik changed reality so that Rogers would believe Hydra to be good, permanently altering his memories so that Rogers believed that he had always been a member of Hydra. He covers Erik Selvig's death and pushes Jack Flag off from Baron Helmut Zemo's airplane. Additionally, it is revealed that his abusive father, Joseph, was actually killed by Hydra and that Hydra deceived him into thinking Joseph died of a heart attack. It is also revealed that Rogers witnessed his mother, Sarah, being killed by Sinclair's Hydra goons and kidnapped him which is the reason why he held a grudge towards Hydra's evilness and plans to kill the Red Skull's clone and restore Hydra's lost honor. As part of his long-term plans, Steve further compromised Sam Wilson's image as Captain America by using his familiarity with the shield to deliberately put Wilson in a position unable to save a senator from Flag-Smasher, with the final goal of demoralizing Sam to the point of returning the shield to Rogers, not wanting to kill Wilson and risk a martyr. The discovery of new Inhuman Ulysses with the ability to "predict" the future by calculating complex patterns, to which Rogers has set out to prevent Ulysses from learning of his true plans and allegiance. Rogers does this by "forcing" certain predictions, such as anonymously providing Bruce Banner with new gamma research to provoke a vision that would drive the Avengers to kill, although this plan has apparently backfired with a recent vision showing the new Spider-Man standing over his dead body. Despite this revelation, Rogers presents himself as the voice of reason by allowing Spider-Man to flee with Thor, inspiring doubt in Tony Stark by suggesting acting against Carol Danvers due to not like being top dog. He then goes to Washington, D.C., resulting in further confusion. Later, Rogers goes to Sokovia and joins forces with Black Widow to liberate freedom fighters to reclaim their country and goes to his base where Selvig expresses concern of his plan to kill the Red Skull, revealing that he has Zemo in a cell and planns to recruit. He eventually kills the Red Skull after Professor X's brain fragment is extracted, throwing the Red Skull out of a window over a cliff after Sin and Crossbones affirm allegiance to the Hydra Supreme. Rogers is the head of S.H.I.E.L.D, using a subsequent alien invasion and a mass supervillain assault to control the United States. He neutralizes the superheroes that might oppose him, seeking the Cosmic Cube to rewrite reality where Hydra won World War II. Rick Jones uses the Cosmic Cube to help the remaining Avengers, the true Steve Rogers exist within the Cosmic Cube itself. He is able to mostly reassemble the Cosmic Cube, but Wilson and the Winter Soldier are able to use a fragment to restore his true counterpart to defeat his Hydra self, subsequently using the Cosmic Cube to undo most of Hydra's damage by manipulating reality even if the physical damage remains. He continues to exist as a separate entity and in a prison as the only inmate. His main counterpart received a pardon while he was leaving his prison to be ambushed and killed by Selene.

Supreme Leader in other media 
 A similar character appears in The Avengers: Earth's Mightiest Heroes, voiced by Brian Bloom. This version is a Skrull impersonator of Captain America acting on the Skrull Queen Veranke's orders.
 In Avengers Assemble, elements of the character is amalgamated with Steve Rogers / Captain America. A patriotic-themed battlesuit resembling the Civil Warrior (and Iron Patriot) is seen in Ultron Revolution, and his streamlined suit is featured in Secret Wars.
 A variation of Captain Hydra appears in Iron Man and Captain America: Heroes United.
 The Civil Warrior is a playable character in the video game Marvel: Contest of Champions.

Surtur

Swarm

Sway
Sway (Suzanne Chan) is a fictional character appearing in American comic books published by Marvel Comics. She first appeared in X-Men: Deadly Genesis #3 as one of the "Missing X-Men". She was created by writer Ed Brubaker and artist Pete Woods.

Originally from Hong Kong, David and Emily Chan became naturalized citizens of the United States after living twenty years in California. They had a daughter named Suzanne, who, at 17 years old, wanted to attend Barnard College on the east coast of the United States and planned a trip to New York City to prove to her parents that she would be safe on her own after moving. During the trip, David and Emily were gunned down in a crossfire between gangs in Chinatown. Although standing a few feet from her parents, Suzanne was unscathed, which perplexed police detectives.

After the shooting, Suzanne entered a state of shock. She could only dwell on the fact that when the shooting started, she had somehow stopped the bullets in midair and was able to get herself out of the path of the bullets. In actuality, she had stopped time around the bullets, effectively freezing them in place. Unfortunately, she was unable to do the same for her parents, and could only watch as the bullets tore into them.

The police placed the traumatized girl in a hospital for forty-eight-hour observation, during which she mostly slept and cried. When she was released, she was told that the police were looking into things, but they did not have any leads. Wandering the streets, she returned to the spot where her parents were killed. Suddenly, her mutant powers activated again, and she was able to see past events in the area, namely the phantoms of herself and her parents. After witnessing the shooting for a second time, Suzanne followed the phantom car, carrying her parents’ murderers, throughout the city. She then realized that she somehow had control over the flow of time, and she was making it replay itself for her.

Suzanne followed the murderers to their front door, and inside she could see them celebrating. She called the police, and when they arrived, the killers opened fire. Consciously using her power for the first time, she froze the bullets and the killers in time. After giving her statement to the police, the detective contacted Dr. Moira MacTaggert, who then offered Suzanne a chance to train in the use of her mutant abilities. She took the code-name Sway and went with MacTaggert. She was in the first team, along with Kid Vulcan, Darwin, and Petra to attempt to rescue the X-Men from Krakoa, but was sliced in half by the island's force. With the last of her power, she and the mortally wounded Petra combined their powers to save their remaining teammates from certain death.

When the X-Men established Krakoa as a mutant paradise, Sway was among the revived mutants living there. She, Petra, and Vulcan were residing in the Summer House.

During the "Empyre" storyline, Sway and Petra have a drink with Vulcan at the Summer House on the Moon. After Vulcan defeated his Cotati attackers, Sway and Petra catch up to him.

Sway demonstrated the ability to decelerate and probably stop or even accelerate time around her body, as well as a form of retrocognitive projection that allowed her to replay the recent pasts as short bursts of ghostly images. It's highly possible her powers revolve either around the manipulation of gravitation as means for spacetime curvature or the control of chronitons, much like Tempo, another time-manipulating mutant. By focusing carefully, Suzanne was able to slow down and stop objects entirely, enabling her to freeze projectiles in mid-air, immobilize her enemies, and various other effects. Apparently, Suzanne's training had honed her abilities to the point where she could target specific objects in her range or everything within a certain radius.

Jenny Swensen

Beverly Switzler

Sword Master

Swordsman

Kevin Sydney

Sydren

S'ym
S'ym is depicted as a demon of Limbo who served as a frequent enemy and sometimes supporting character in The Uncanny X-Men and The New Mutants. He was created as an homage to independent cartoonist Dave Sim's character Cerebus the Aardvark.

S'ym was a minion of Belasco, the ruler of the demonic dimension known as Otherplace or Demonic Limbo. S'ym battles the X-Men when the team is transported to Limbo via teleportation "discs" in their search for 7-year-old Illyana Rasputin, the younger sister of the X-Man Colossus.

During Illyana's seven years in Limbo, Belasco takes her as his heir and apprentice. She ultimately defeats him, becoming Limbo's new ruler, and S'ym's master, before returning to the X-Men. S'ym challenges Illyana's newfound status as Limbo's ruler. Illyana defeats S'ym, leaving S'ym to agree to serve Illyana whenever she visits Limbo. S'ym allies himself with the extraterrestrial Magus, allowing himself to be infected with a techno-organic virus. Though Illyana tries to take Limbo back from him several times after this, she is unable to defeat him and S'ym's hold on Limbo only increases as he spreads the techno-organic virus to other demons.

S'ym also took an interest in Madelyne Pryor, and even toyed with her self-doubt, and tempted her with great power. S'ym was later revealed to be partners with the demon N'astirh in manipulating Illyana into opening a portal to Earth so they can unleash a demonic invasion. Once the invasion had begun, S'ym betrayed N'astirh and the two fought each other for rule of Limbo and Earth. Shortly after, Illyana sacrifices herself to banish the invaders back to Limbo, including S'ym, and N'astirh is killed.

Now the undisputed ruler of Limbo, S'ym plots a new invasion of Earth. He plans on using the Nexus of All Realities to invade Earth, but is stopped by his former master Belasco, who manipulates Cable into confronting S'ym. Belasco reasserts his control over both S'ym and Limbo. The two are later defeated by Nightcrawler as his girlfriend, Amanda Sefton, takes over Limbo. S'ym turns to an alliance with the Archenemy, a powerful magical entity, and disguises himself as Duke Bleys, becoming one of Sefton's most trusted advisers. As Bleys, S'ym tricks Sefton into allying herself with many other demon lords and merging their various realms and dimensions into a single bastion against the Archenemy. S'ym then reveals his true identity and reveals that the single, united realm is an easier target for the Archenemy than the countless dimensions he was fighting before. Nonetheless, Sefton and her army manage to slay the Archenemy and undo the merging of realms.

S'ym is next seen in the New X-Men "The Quest for Magik" storyline. Illyana returns to rule Limbo and S'ym is shown to be one of her servants. He appears to be free of the techno-organic virus, with no explanation given.

When Witchfire learns that Magik has left Limbo during the X-Infernus storyline, she assumes control. She stabs S'ym through the chest, seriously wounding him. Magik teleports in to find him chained to the throne. She asks what happened and he informs her that Belasco's daughter, Witchfire has taken control in her absence.

During the Second Coming storyline, a recovered S'ym is seen reporting to N'astirh that a small squad of X-Men had come to Limbo to rescue Magik, revealing in the meantime that N'astirh was the mastermind behind the abduction of Magik in the first place.

During the "Dark Web" storyline, Belasco mentioned that S'ym will be among the characters that will be after Belasco's misplaced Soulsword in the Screaming Tower. After Black Cat uses her grapple to pull herself and Mary Jane Watson out of the bottomless pit that the cursed and cannibalistic inhabitants chased them into, they find S'ym at the top.

Synapse

Max Mullins

Emily Guerrero

Synch

Margali Szardos
Margali Szardos, also known as Margali of the Winding Way, Red Queen or Fata Morgana, is a fictional character appearing in American comic books published by Marvel Comics. She first appeared in The Uncanny X-Men Annual #4, and was created by writer Chris Claremont and artist John Romita Jr. based on sketches by John Byrne. Margali is Nightcrawler's adopted mother. She is also the biological mother of Amanda Sefton, formerly known as Daytripper and the second Magik.

Margali Szardos' past is as much of an enigma as she is. She was supposedly born in Paris, France and taught magic by her mother, but she has yet to reveal her true origins. Margali's particular discipline of magic is called 'The Winding Way.' 

Once having been married, Szardos has two children: Stefan and Jimaine (aka Amanda Sefton). She supposedly had an affair with the demonic mutant Azazel who, at the time, had also seduced Mystique, who was then posing as the wife of Baron Christian Wagner. The Baron, who was infertile, suspected his wife of infidelity and, when the pain of childbirth caused Mystique to shift back to her natural form and deliver a devilish-looking child, the locals rose up against mother and son. Mystique fled, throwing the child over a waterfall, where he was later found and adopted by Margali. Whether she knew the child's origins or not, she raised the boy as her own.

Working at Der Jahrmarkt as a fortune-teller to cover her tracks, Margali discovered that the Demon Belasco was sowing seeds of destruction into the Earth. She tricked her daughter into staying with her in Der Jahrmarkt by killing Sabu, Jimaine and Kurt's trapeze mentor. A day after Sabu's death, Kurt left Der Jahrmarkt to start a new life with the X-Men. Jimaine followed him to America and changed her name to Amanda Sefton, taking a job as a flight attendant. She and Kurt have since had an on-again, off-again relationship.

Years later, Margali learned that Kurt had killed Stefan. Too deep in grief to question why, Margali exiled Nightcrawler's soul to a dimension resembling "Dante's Inferno." With help from Jimaine and Doctor Strange, Kurt was exonerated.

During Margali's time of weakness on The Winding Way, she was captured by the demon D'Spayre. After being rescued by Jimaine and Nightcrawler, Margali began her quest to take possession of a magical weapon called the Soulsword. Margali tricked her daughter once again by giving her a warning about a sorcerer called Gravemoss who was trying to kill all above him on The Winding Way. Amanda travelled to Muir Island and found that Gravemoss had possessed Kurt. After defeating Gravemoss, Amanda gave her mother the Soulsword and Margali used it to kill all the other sorcerers stationed above her. Amanda then joined Excalibur under the code name Daytripper.

Hoping to release a demon under London, Margali joined the U.K. branch of the Hellfire Club as the Red Queen and kidnapped the mutant hybrid Douglock. Her efforts were foiled by Excalibur and Margali disappeared only to be captured by Belasco. With her last bit of magic, she swapped souls with her daughter. Margali's soul, now in Amanda's body, took Nightcrawler to Limbo, where they were able to rescue her body and defeat Belasco. After the battle, Nightcrawler returned to the X-Men and Margali left Amanda to rule Limbo. Amanda then took the name Magik for herself.

Margali has reappeared recently to find Nightmare torturing her daughter. Nightmare was under control of a demon called Hive who was looking for the Soulsword. Nightcrawler was able to defeat Hive with the help of Margali, Jimaine and Nightmare. During the battle, Margali revealed that Nightcrawler possessed the Soulsword. Nightcrawler currently keeps the Soulsword inside his body.

Because of Margali's indiscriminate use of magic, she and Amanda parted ways on tense terms. Following Nightcrawler's resurrection and his reunion with Amanda, Margali began to lust for the secrets of the afterlife. For this purpose, she engineered an attack by a quasi-robotic villain of her own creation called Trimega, pushing Nightcrawler into granting her sanctuary at the Jean Grey School for Higher Learning. Once there, she attacked Storm and Beast, who had participated in Nightcrawler's recovery, converting their bodies into pictures of their memories. Stealing those memories relating to their experiences in the afterlife, she opened a portal into the Beyond. Intent on closing it from the other side, Nightcrawler and Amanda attempted to pass the gate, but Nightcrawler's voluntary exile from Heaven barred him from entry, stranding Amanda alone in the Void.

Margali is an accomplished sorceress, equal of almost any sorcerer on Earth, occupying "The Winding Way's" highest position. The Winding Way grants mystic power, but that power ebbs and flows unpredictably, affecting the strength of Margali's magic. Margali can cast spells and transform herself. As the Red Queen she manifested her magic as a flaming sword, could extend her nails into long talons, and fire blasts of red arcane energy. Upon her first meeting of Doctor Strange, she summoned his Eye of Agamotto away from him against his will, a feat which made him consider that her powers could rival or dwarf his own.

Margali Szardos in other media
Margali appears in the X-Men: Evolution episode "The Toad, the Witch and the Wardrobe". Along with her daughter, Amanda, her history and background from the comics is not represented, and is instead portrayed as a normal Gypsy woman. She is voiced by Teryl Rothery.

References
  Some of the content in this article was copied from Star at the Marvel wiki, which is licensed under the Creative Commons Attribution-Share Alike 3.0 (Unported) (CC-BY-SA 3.0) license.

Marvel Comics characters: S, List of